= List of ground beetle genera =

This page lists the genera in the family Carabidae, according to Catalogue of Life and Carabcat Database as of March 2023, excluding Tiger Beetles (which are considered to be in the family Cicindelidae).

== Family Carabidae ==
=== Subfamily Anthiinae Bonelli, 1813 ===
Tribe Anthiini Bonelli, 1813

Anthia Weber, 1801
Atractonotus Perroud, 1847
Baeoglossa Chaudoir, 1850
Cycloloba Chaudoir, 1850
Cypholoba Chaudoir, 1850
Eccoptoptera Chaudoir, 1878
Gonogenia Chaudoir, 1844
Netrodera Chaudoir, 1850

Tribe Helluonini Hope, 1838

Subtribe Helluonina Hope, 1838

Aenigma Newman, 1836
Ametroglossus Sloane, 1914
Dicranoglossus Chaudoir, 1872
Epimicodema Sloane, 1914
Gigadema J.Thomson, 1859
Helluapterus Sloane, 1914
Helluarchus Sloane, 1914
Helluo Bonelli, 1813
Helluodema Laporte, 1867
Helluonidius Chaudoir, 1872
Helluopapua Darlington, 1968
Helluosoma Laporte, 1867
Neohelluo Sloane, 1914
Platyhelluo Baehr, 2005

Subtribe Omphrina Jedlicka, 1941

Colfax Andrewes, 1920
Creagris Nietner, 1857
Dailodontus Reiche, 1843
Erephognathus Alluaud, 1932
Helluobrochus Reichardt, 1974
Helluomorpha Laporte, 1834
Helluomorphoides Ball, 1951
Macrocheilus Hope, 1838
Meladroma Motschulsky, 1855
Omphra Dejean, 1825
Pleuracanthus Gray, 1832
Triaenogenius Chaudoir, 1877

Tribe Physocrotaphini Chaudoir, 1863

Anguloderus Anichtchenko & Sciaky, 2017
Foveocrotaphus Anichtchenko, 2014
Helluodes Westwood, 1847
Holoponerus Fairmaire, 1883
Physocrotaphus Parry, 1849
Physoglossus Akhil & Sabu, 2020
Pogonoglossus Chaudoir, 1863
Schuelea Baehr, 2004

=== Subfamily Apotominae LeConte, 1853 ===
Apotomus Illiger, 1807

=== Subfamily Brachininae Bonelli, 1810 ===
Tribe Brachinini Bonelli, 1810

Aptinoderus Hubenthal, 1919
Aptinus Bonelli, 1810
Brachinulus Basilewsky, 1958
Brachinus Weber, 1801
Mastax Fischer von Waldheim, 1828
Pheropsophus Solier, 1833
Styphlodromus Basilewsky, 1959
Styphlomerus Chaudoir in Putzeys, 1875

Tribe Crepidogastrini Jeannel, 1949

Brachynillus Reitter, 1904
Crepidogaster Boheman, 1848
Crepidogastrillus Basilewsky, 1959
Crepidogastrinus Basilewsky, 1957
Crepidolomus Basilewsky, 1959
Crepidonellus Basilewsky, 1959

=== Subfamily Broscinae Hope, 1838 ===
Tribe Broscini Hope, 1838

Subtribe Axonyina Roig-Juñent, 2000

Broscodes Bolivar y Pieltain, 1914
Rawlinsius Davidson & Ball, 1998

Subtribe Baripodina Jeannel, 1941

Baripus Dejean, 1828
Bembidiomorphum Champion, 1918

Subtribe Broscina Hope, 1838

Broscodera Lindroth, 1961
Broscosoma Rosenhauer, 1846
Broscus Panzer, 1813
Chaetobroscus Semenov, 1900
Craspedonotus Schaum, 1863
Eobroscus Kryzhanovskij, 1951
Kashmirobroscus J.Schmidt; Wrase & Sciaky, 2013
Miscodera Eschscholtz, 1830
Zacotus LeConte, 1869

Subtribe Creobiina Jeannel, 1941

Acallistus Sharp, 1886
Adotela Laporte, 1867
Anheterus Putzeys, 1868
Bountya Townsend, 1971
Brithysternum W.J.MacLeay, 1873
Cascellius Curtis, 1838
Cerotalis Laporte, 1867
Creobius Guérin-Méneville, 1838
Gnathoxys Westwood, 1842
Nothocascellius Roig-Juñent, 1995
Promecoderus Dejean, 1829

Subtribe Nothobroscina Roig-Juñent, 2000

Chylnus Sloane, 1920
Diglymma Sharp, 1886
Eurylychnus Bates, 1891
Mecodema Blanchard, 1843
Monteremita Seldon & Holwell, 2019
Nothobroscus Roig-Juñent & Ball, 1995
Oregus Putzeys, 1868
Orthoglymma Liebherr; Marris; Emberson; Syrett & Roig-Juñent, 2011
Percolestus Sloane, 1892
Percosoma Schaum, 1858

=== Subfamily Carabinae Linnaeus, 1802 ===
Tribe Carabini Linnaeus, 1802

Subtribe Carabina Linnaeus, 1802

Aplothorax G.R.Waterhouse, 1842
Calosoma Weber, 1801
Carabus Linnaeus, 1758

Subtribe Ceroglossina Lapouge, 1927

Ceroglossus Solier, 1848

Tribe Cychrini Perty, 1830

Subtribe Cychrina Perty, 1830

Cychropsis Boileau, 1901
Cychrus Fabricius, 1794
Scaphinotus Dejean, 1826
Sphaeroderus Dejean, 1826

Subtribe Pamborina Hope, 1838

Maoripamborus Brookes, 1944
Pamborus Latreille, 1812

=== Subfamily Ctenodactylinae Laporte, 1834 ===
Tribe Ctenodactylini Laporte, 1834

Alachnothorax Liebke, 1929
Amblycoleus Chaudoir, 1872
Antipionycha Liebke, 1928
Askalaphium Liebke, 1938
Ctenodactyla Dejean, 1825
Leptotrachelon Liebke, 1928
Leptotrachelus Latreille, 1829
Oilea Liebke, 1931
Parapionycha Liebke, 1929
Pionycha Chaudoir, 1848
Plagiotelum Solier, 1849
Propionycha Liebke, 1928
Pseudometabletus Liebke, 1930
Schidonychus Klug, 1834
Teukrus Liebke, 1931
Wate Liebke, 1928

Tribe Hexagoniini G.Horn, 1881

Dinopelma Bates, 1889
Hexagonia Kirby, 1825
Omphreoides Fairmaire, 1896

=== Subfamily Dryptinae Bonelli, 1810 ===
Tribe Dryptini Bonelli, 1810

Desera Hope, 1831
Drypta Latreille, 1797
Megadrypta Sciaky & Anichtchenko, 2020
Neodrypta Basilewsky, 1960
Nesiodrypta Jeannel, 1949
Prionodrypta Jeannel, 1949

Tribe Galeritini Kirby, 1825

Ancystroglossus Chaudoir, 1863
Eunostus Laporte, 1835
Galerita Fabricius, 1801
Trichognatha Latreille, 1829

Tribe Zuphiini Bonelli, 1810

Subtribe Dicrodontina Machado, 1992

Dicrodontus Chaudoir, 1872

Subtribe Leleupidiina Basilewsky, 1951

Colasidia Basilewsky, 1954
Gunvorita Landin, 1955
Leleupidia Basilewsky, 1951
Neoleleupidia Basilewsky, 1953
Paraleleupidia Basilewsky, 1951

Subtribe Planetina Jedlicka, 1941

Planetes W.S.MacLeay, 1825

Subtribe Zuphiina Bonelli, 1810

Acrogenys W.J.MacLeay, 1864
Agastus Schmidt-Goebel, 1846
Chaudoirella Mateu, 1982
Coarazuphium Gnaspini; Vanin & Godoy, 1998
Ildobates Español, 1966
Metaxidius Chaudoir, 1852
Metazuphium Mateu, 1992
Mischocephalus Chaudoir, 1863
Parazuphium Jeannel, 1942
Polistichus Bonelli, 1810
Pseudaptinus Laporte, 1834
Speothalpius B.Moore, 1995
Speozuphium B.Moore, 1995
Typhlozuphium Baehr, 2014
Zuphioides Ball & Shpeley, 2013
Zuphium Latreille, 1805

=== Subfamily Elaphrinae Latreille, 1802 ===
Blethisa Bonelli, 1810
Diacheila Motschulsky, 1844
Elaphrus Fabricius, 1775
†Elaphrotites Haupt, 1856

=== Subfamily Gineminae Ball & Shpeley, 2002 ===
Ginema Ball & Shpeley, 2002

=== Subfamily Harpalinae Bonelli, 1810 ===
Tribe Anisodactylini Lacordaire, 1854

Allendia Noonan, 1974
Allocinopus Broun, 1903
Amphasia Newman, 1838
Anisodactylus Dejean, 1829
Anisostichus Emden, 1953
Cenogmus Sloane, 1898
Chydaeus Chaudoir, 1854
Crasodactylus Guérin-Méneville, 1847
Criniventer Emden, 1953
Diachromus Erichson, 1837
Dicheirus Mannerheim, 1843
Gaioxenus Broun, 1910
Geopinus LeConte, 1847
Gnathaphanus W.S.MacLeay, 1825
Gynandromorphus Dejean, 1829
Haplaner Chaudoir, 1878
Harpalomimetes Schauberger in Csiki, 1932
Hypharpax W.S.MacLeay, 1825
Maoriharpalus Larochelle & Larivière, 2005
Nornalupia Kataev, 2002
Notiobia Perty, 1830
Parabaris Broun, 1881
Progonochaetus G.Müller, 1938
Pseudanisotarsus Noonan, 1973
Pseudognathaphanus Schauberger, 1932
Pseudorhysopus Kataev & Wrase, 2001
Rhysopus Andrewes, 1929
Scybalicus Schaum, 1862
Triplosarus Bates, 1874
Tuiharpalus Larochelle & Larivière, 2005
Xestonotus LeConte, 1853

Tribe Harpalini Bonelli, 1810

Subtribe Amblystomina Fauvel, 1889

Amblystomus Erichson, 1837
Anomostomus LaFerté-Sénectère, 1853
Barysomus Dejean, 1829
Oosoma Nietner, 1857

Subtribe Ditomina Bonelli, 1810

Bronislavia Semenov, 1891
Carenochyrus Solsky, 1874
Carterus Dejean, 1830
Chilotomus Chaudoir, 1842
Ditomus Bonelli, 1810
Dixus Billberg, 1820
Eocarterus Stichel, 1923
Eucarterus Reitter, 1900
Graniger Motschulsky, 1864
Indocarterus Kataev & Wrase, 2018
Liochirus Tschitscherine, 1897
Machozetus Chaudoir, 1850
Odotoncarus Solier, 1835
Oedesis Motschulsky, 1850
Pachycarus Solier, 1835
Parapenthus Kataev & Wrase, 2018
Penthus Chaudoir, 1843
Phorticosomus Schaum, 1863
Proditomus Schauberger, 1934
Pseudaristus Reitter, 1900
Tschitscherinellus Csiki, 1906

Subtribe Harpalina Bonelli, 1810

Acinopus Dejean, 1821
Afromizonus Basilewsky, 1947
Allosiopelus N.Ito, 1995
Amblygnathus Dejean, 1829
Anisocnemus Chaudoir, 1843
Athrostictus Bates, 1878
Axinotoma Dejean, 1829
Aztecarpalus Ball, 1970
Bleusea Bedel, 1897
Boeomimetes Péringuey, 1896
Bradybaenus Dejean, 1829
Coleolissus Bates, 1892
Cratacanthus Dejean, 1829
Cratognathus Dejean, 1829
Daptus Fischer von Waldheim, 1823
Dioryche W.S.MacLeay, 1825
Discoderus LeConte, 1853
Dregus Motschulsky, 1864
Ectinothorax Alluaud, 1941
Eriophonus Tschitscherine, 1901
Euryderus LeConte, 1846
Geodromus Dejean, 1829
Harpalinus Jeannel, 1946
Harpaliscus Bates, 1892
Harpalobrachys Tschitscherine, 1899
Harpalodiodes Bousquet, 2002
Harpalomimus Facchini & Giachino, 2020
Harpalomorphus Péringuey, 1896
Harpalus Latreille, 1802
Harpathaumas Basilewsky, 1947
Harponixus Basilewsky, 1950
Hartonymus Casey, 1914
Heteracantha Brullé, 1835
Hyphaereon W.S.MacLeay, 1825
Indiophonus N.Ito, 1996
Kareya Andrewes, 1919
Lampetes Andrewes, 1940
Laparhetes Jeannel, 1946
Liodaptus Bates, 1889
Meroctenus Gemminger & Harold, 1868
Microderes Faldermann, 1836
Neoaulacoryssus Noonan, 1985
Neodiachipteryx Noonan, 1985
Neohyparpalus Clarke, 1981
Neophygas Noonan, 1976
Nesacinopus Tschitscherine, 1900
Nesarpalus Bedel, 1897
Nipponoharpalus Habu, 1973
Nothodaptus Maindron, 1906
Oesyperus Andrewes, 1923
Omostropus Péringuey, 1896
Ooidius Chaudoir, 1847
Ophoniscus Bates, 1892
Ophonus Dejean, 1821
Oxycentrus Chaudoir, 1854
Panagrius Andrewes, 1933
Pangus Dejean, 1821
Parasiopelus Basilewsky, 1946
Paraulacoryssus Shpeley; Hunting & Ball, 2017
Parophonus Ganglbauer, 1891
Paulianoscirtus Basilewsky, 1976
Penthophonus Reitter, 1900
Piosoma LeConte, 1847
Platymetopsis Ball & Maddison, 1987
Platymetopus Dejean, 1829
Prakasha Andrewes, 1919
Pseudodiachipteryx Burgeon, 1936
Pseudohyparpalus Basilewsky, 1946
Pseudoselenophorus Péringuey, 1896
Selenophorus Dejean, 1829
Selenotichnus Kataev, 1999
Siopelophonus Kataev, 2015
Siopelus Murray, 1859
Stenomorphus Dejean, 1831
Trichopselaphus Chaudoir, 1843
Trichotichnus A.Morawitz, 1863
Trichoxycentrus N.Ito, 2000
Typsiharpalus Tschitscherine, 1901

Tribe Pelmatellini Bates, 1882

Hakaharpalus Larochelle & Larivière, 2005
Kupeharpalus Larochelle & Larivière, 2005
Lecanomerus Chaudoir, 1850
Nemaglossa Solier, 1849
Notospeophonus B.Moore, 1962
Pelmatellus Bates, 1882
Syllectus Bates, 1878
Trachysarus Reed, 1874

Tribe Stenolophini Kirby, 1837

Acupalpus Latreille, 1829
Agonoleptus Casey, 1914
Amerinus Casey, 1884
Angionychus Klug, 1853
Anthracus Motschulsky, 1850
Batoscelis Dejean, 1836
Bradycellus Erichson, 1837
Cratosoma Jeannel, 1948
Cyptomicrus Vinson, 1939
Dicheirotrichus Jacquelin du Val, 1855
Egadyla Alluaud, 1916
Euthenarus Bates, 1874
Fuminoria Morita, 2006
Goniocellus Casey, 1914
Gugheorites Basilewsky, 1951
Haplanister B.Moore, 1996
Hemiaulax Bates, 1892
Hippoloetis Laporte, 1835
Idiomelas Tschitscherine, 1900
Kaffovatus Clarke, 1972
Kenyacus Alluaud, 1917
Kiwiharpalus Larochelle & Larivière, 2005
Lioholus Tschitscherine, 1897
Loxoncus Schmidt-Goebel, 1846
Pachytrachelus Chaudoir, 1852
Parabradycellus N.Ito, 2003
Paramecus Dejean, 1829
Philodes LeConte, 1861
Pholeodytes Britton, 1962
Pogonodaptus G.Horn, 1881
Polpochila Solier, 1849
Psychristus Andrewes, 1930
Rhabidius Basilewsky, 1948
Stenolophus Dejean, 1821
Uenanthracus Kasahara, 1994

=== Subfamily Hiletinae Schiödte, 1847 ===
Eucamaragnathus Jeannel, 1938
Hiletus Schiödte, 1847

=== Subfamily Lebiinae Bonelli, 1810 ===
Tribe Cyclosomini Laporte, 1834

Subtribe Corsyrina Ganglbauer

Corsyra Dejean, 1825
Discoptera Semenov, 1889

Subtribe Cyclosomina Laporte, 1834

Cyclosomus Latreille, 1829
Sarothrocrepis Chaudoir, 1850
Tetragonoderus Dejean, 1829

Subtribe Graphipterina Latreille, 1802

Graphipterus Latreille, 1802
Piezia Brullé, 1834
Trichopiezia Nègre, 1955

Subtribe Masoreina Chaudoir, 1871

Anaulacus W.S.MacLeay, 1825
Atlantomasoreus Mateu, 1984
Leuropus Andrewes, 1947
Lophidius Dejean, 1831
Masoreus Dejean, 1821
Mnuphorus Chaudoir, 1873
Odontomasoreus Darlington, 1968
Somoplatodes Basilewsky, 1986
Somoplatus Dejean, 1829

Subtribe Nemotarsina Bates, 1883

Nemotarsus LeConte, 1853

Tribe Lachnophorini LeConte, 1853

Subtribe Calophaenina Jeannel, 1948

Calophaena Klug, 1821
Calophaenoidea Liebke, 1930

Subtribe Lachnophorina LeConte, 1853

Amphithasus Bates, 1871
Anchonoderus Reiche, 1843
Aporesthus Bates, 1871
Asklepia Liebke, 1938
Balligratus Moret & Ortuño, 2017
Calybe Laporte, 1834
Ega Laporte, 1834
Eucaerus LeConte, 1853
Euphorticus G.Horn, 1881
Grundmannius Basilewsky, 1965
Guatemalteca Erwin, 2004
Lachnaces Bates, 1872
Lachnophorus Dejean, 1831
Peruphorticus Erwin & Zamorano, 2014
Pseudophorticus Erwin, 2004
Selina Motschulsky, 1858

Tribe Lebiini Bonelli, 1810

Subtribe Agrina Kirby, 1837

Abaditicus Ball & Hilchie, 1983
Abrodiella Bousquet, 2002
Agra Fabricius, 1801
Allardina Basilewsky, 1963
Amelus Chaudoir, 1873
Anomotariella Baehr, 2012
Anomotarus Chaudoir, 1875
Apterodromites Mateu, 1976
Aspasiola Chaudoir, 1877
Calleida Latreille, 1824
Calleidomorpha Motschulsky, 1855
Callidadelpha Steinheil, 1875
Chaudoirina Mateu, 1955
Cryptobatis Eschscholtz, 1829
Cyanotarus Reed, 1874
Cylindronotum Putzeys, 1845
Demetrida White, 1846
Diabaticus Bates, 1878
Do Baehr, 2009
Dromidea Perroud & Montrouzier, 1864
Epikastea Liebke, 1935
Eujalmenus Bousquet, 2002
Euplatia Chaudoir, 1873
Eurycalleida Maindron, 1905
Falsodromius Mateu, 1976
Glycia Chaudoir, 1842
Hyboptera Chaudoir, 1873
Hybopteroides Erwin & Ball, 2012
Infernophilus Larson, 1969
Kteatus Liebke, 1936
Lipostratia Chaudoir, 1873
Merizomena Chaudoir, 1873
Mimodromius Chaudoir, 1873
Mimophilorhizus Mateu, 1993
Oechalius Liebke, 1935
Ogygium Liebke, 1935
Onota Chaudoir, 1873
Otoglossa Chaudoir, 1873
Paraglycia Bedel, 1904
Phacocerus Chaudoir, 1873
Philophuga Motschulsky, 1859
Phloeocarabus W.J.MacLeay, 1871
Plochionus Dejean, 1821
Pontonoa Liebke, 1935
Pseudotoglossa Mateu, 1961
Pylartesius Liebke, 1939
Rugitarus Baehr, 2009
Speotarus B.Moore, 1964
Straneotia Mateu, 1961
Tecnophilus Chaudoir, 1877
Teiresia Liebke, 1935
Thoasia Liebke, 1939
Titaresius Liebke, 1935
Trigonothops W.J.MacLeay, 1864
Valeriaaschero Erwin, 2004
Vianasia Mateu, 1955

Subtribe Apenina Ball

Apenes LeConte, 1851
Cymindoidea Laporte, 1833
Habutarus Ball & Hilchie, 1983
Platytarus Fairmaire, 1850
Trymosternus Chaudoir, 1873

Subtribe Celaenephina Habu, 1982

Celaenephes Schmidt-Goebel, 1846

Subtribe Cymindidina Laporte, 1834

Afrotarus Jeannel, 1949
Assadecma Basilewsky, 1982
Cymindis Latreille, 1805
Hystrichopus Boheman, 1848
Leptosarcus Péringuey, 1896
Metaxymorphus Chaudoir, 1850
Petrimagnia Kryzhanovskij & Mikhailov, 1971
Pinacodera Schaum, 1857
Plagiopyga Boheman, 1848
Pseudomasoreus Desbrochers des Loges, 1904
Taridius Chaudoir, 1875

Subtribe Demetriadina Bates, 1886

Cylindrocranius Chaudoir, 1878
Demetrias Bonelli, 1810

Subtribe Dromiusina Bonelli, 1810

Afrodromius Basilewsky, 1958
Axinopalpus LeConte, 1846
Barrymooreana Baehr, 1997
Brachynopterus Bedel, 1898
Brigalowia Baehr, 2006
Calodromius Reitter, 1905
Carbonellia Mateu, 1968
Disciferella Kataev & Muilwijk, 2020
Dromiops Péringuey, 1898
Dromius Bonelli, 1810
Dromoceryx Schmidt-Goebel, 1846
Geoffreyella Baehr, 2012
Klepteromimus Péringuey, 1898
Mesolestes Schatzmayr, 1943
Metadromius Bedel, 1907
Microdaccus Schaum in Baudi di Selve, 1864
Microlestes Schmidt-Goebel, 1846
Microlestodes Baehr, 1987
Monnea Mateu, 1970
Negrea Mateu, 1968
Omophagus Andrewes, 1937
Oxoides Solier, 1849
Paradromius Fowler, 1887
Philorhizus Hope, 1838
Polyaulacus Chaudoir, 1878
Psammodromius Peyerimhoff, 1927
Pseudomonnea Mateu, 1983
Somalodromius Mateu, 1967
Xenodromius Bates, 1891
Zolotarevskyella Mateu, 1953

Subtribe Gallerucidiina Chaudoir, 1872

Gallerucidia Chaudoir, 1872
Lebidia A.Morawitz, 1862

Subtribe Lebiina Bonelli, 1810

Alkestis Liebke, 1939
Aristolebia Bates, 1892
Daer Semenov & Znojko, 1929
Lachnolebia Maindron, 1905
Lebia Latreille, 1802
Lebidema Motschulsky, 1864
Lebiomorphica Lorenz, 1998
Lebistina Motschulsky, 1864
Lebistinida Péringuey, 1898
Lionedya Chaudoir, 1871
Matabele Péringuey, 1896
Megalebia Mateu, 1972
Orthobasis Chaudoir, 1871
Pachylebia Jeannel, 1949
Pachylebiodes Mateu, 1972
Paulianolebia Mateu, 1972
Pseudopachylebia Mateu, 1972
Rhopalostyla Chaudoir, 1850
Scalidion Schmidt-Goebel, 1846
Setolebia Jedlicka, 1941
Sofota Jedlicka, 1951

Subtribe Lichnasthenina J.Thomson

Astastus Péringuey, 1896
Australovelinda Baehr, 2012
Imasakaia Arai & Morita, 2010
Lichnasthenus J.Thomson, 1858
Mimovelindopsis Mateu, 1963
Velinda Andrewes, 1921
Velindastus Schüle & Lorenz, 2008
Velindomimus Jeannel, 1955
Velindopsis Burgeon, 1937

Subtribe Lionychina Jeannel, 1948

Apristomimus Mateu, 1969
Apristus Chaudoir, 1846
Eremolestes Maindron, 1905
Lionychus Wissmann, 1846
Lorestania Anichtchenko, 2011
Metablus Jedlicka, 1958
Omobrus Andrewes, 1930
Singiliomimus Péringuey, 1896
Syntomus Hope, 1838
Tilius Chaudoir, 1876
Trichidema Basilewsky, 1956

Subtribe Metallicina Basilewsky, 1984

Euproctinus Leng & Mutchler, 1927
Metallica Chaudoir, 1873
Pachycallida Jeannel, 1949
Parena Motschulsky, 1860

Subtribe Peliocypadina Basilewsky, 1984

Demetriola Jeannel, 1949
Peliocypas Schmidt-Goebel, 1846

Subtribe Pericalina Hope, 1838

Agonocheila Chaudoir, 1848
Allophanes Andrewes, 1939
Allophanopsis Louwerens, 1952
Amphimenes Bates, 1873
Amphimenoides Kirschenhofer, 1999
Antimerina Alluaud, 1897
Arsinoe Laporte, 1834
Auchmerus Andrewes, 1929
Bellavalentis Hunting & Yang, 2019
Brachichila Chaudoir, 1870
Brachyctis Chaudoir, 1870
Catascopellus Straneo, 1969
Catascopus Kirby, 1825
Cheilagona Baehr, 2006
Coptodera Dejean, 1825
Coptoglossus Chaudoir, 1870
Coptoptera Chaudoir, 1837
Coptopterella Basilewsky, 1961
Coptopterina Basilewsky, 1956
Crassagena Baehr, 2006
Cylindropectus Lorenz, 1998
Dolichoctis Schmidt-Goebel, 1846
Dontolobus Basilewsky, 1970
Drymatus Motschulsky, 1862
Eucheila Dejean, 1829
Eurycoleus Chaudoir, 1848
Eurydera Laporte, 1831
Formosiella Jedlicka, 1951
Gidda Andrewes, 1920
Glyphodactyla Chaudoir, 1837
Holcoderus Chaudoir, 1870
Horniulus Jedlicka, 1932
Labocephalus Chaudoir, 1848
Lelis Chaudoir, 1870
Lioptera Chaudoir, 1870
Lobodontidius Basilewsky, 1970
Lobodontulus Basilewsky, 1970
Lobodontus Chaudoir, 1842
Madecassina Jeannel, 1949
Mascarenhia Alluaud, 1933
Menarus Andrewes, 1939
Metascopus Basilewsky, 1970
Minuphloeus Darlington, 1968
Minuthodes Andrewes, 1941
Miscelus Klug, 1834
Mochtherus Schmidt-Goebel, 1846
Mormolyce Hagenbach, 1825
Mormolycina Jeannel, 1949
Neocoptodera Jeannel, 1949
Nycteis Laporte, 1835
Oreodicastes Maindron, 1905
Oxyodontus Chaudoir, 1870
Paradolichoctis Baehr, 2006
Pareurydera Jeannel, 1949
Pectinitarsus Fairmaire, 1881
Pericalus W.S.MacLeay, 1825
Philophlaeus Chaudoir, 1844
Phloeoxena Chaudoir, 1870
Pristacrus Chaudoir, 1870
Pseudoplatiella Baehr, 2012
Serrimargo Chaudoir, 1870
Sfitakantha Andrewes, 1919
Sinurus Chaudoir, 1870
Stenognathus Chaudoir, 1843
Stenotelus Bouchard, 1903
Stilboma Andrewes, 1933
Stricklandiana Bousquet, 2002
Tantillus Chaudoir, 1870
Thyreochaetus Basilewsky, 1959
Thyreopterus Dejean, 1831
Thysanotus Chaudoir, 1848
Trichocoptodera Louwerens, 1958
Xanthos Kirschenhofer, 2003
Xenitenopsis Basilewsky, 1956
Xenitenus Péringuey, 1896

Subtribe Physoderina Chaudoir, 1877

Allocota Motschulsky, 1860
Anchista Nietner, 1856
Dasiosoma Britton, 1937
Diamella Shi & Liang, 2013
Endynomena Chaudoir, 1873
Lachnoderma W.J.MacLeay, 1873
Metallanchista Shi & Liang, 2013
Orionella Jedlicka, 1964
Paraphaea Bates, 1873
Physodera Eschscholtz, 1829

Subtribe Pseudotrechina Basilewsky, 1984

Pseudotrechus Rosenhauer, 1856

Subtribe Singilina Jeannel, 1949

Singilis Rambur, 1837

Subtribe Somotrichina Mateu, 1963

Oecornis Britton, 1940
Paulianites Jeannel, 1949
Pephrica Alluaud, 1936
Somotrichus Seidlitz, 1887

Subtribe Sugimotoina Habu, 1975

Sugimotoa Habu, 1975

Subtribe Trichina Basilewsky, 1984

Trichis Klug, 1832

†Cymindoides Motschulsky, 1856
†Lebina Germar, 1813
†Miolebidia Zhang; Liu & Shangguan, 1989
†Protoscalidion L.Schaufuss, 1888

Tribe Odacanthini Laporte, 1834

Subtribe Actenonycina Bates, 1871

Actenonyx White, 1846

Subtribe Homethina Liebherr, 2016

Aeolodermus Andrewes, 1929
Cyphocoleus Chaudoir, 1877
Diplacanthogaster Liebke, 1932
Homethes Newman, 1842
Quammenis Erwin, 2000
Stenocheila Laporte, 1832

Subtribe Odacanthina Laporte, 1834

Anasis Laporte, 1867
Andrewesia Liebke, 1938
Arame Andrewes, 1919
Archicolliuris Liebke, 1931
Asios Liebke, 1933
Aulacolius Sloane, 1923
Basistichus Sloane, 1917
Clarencia Sloane, 1917
Colliuris DeGeer, 1774
Crassacantha Baehr, 1995
Cryptocolliuris Basilewsky, 1955
Deipyrodes Bousquet, 2002
Dicraspeda Chaudoir, 1863
Dobodura Darlington, 1968
Erectocolliuris Liebke, 1931
Eucolliuris Liebke, 1931
Eudalia Laporte, 1867
Gestroania Liebke, 1938
Giachinoana Baehr, 2003
Lachnothorax Motschulsky, 1862
Lasiocera Dejean, 1831
Mimocolliuris Liebke, 1933
Myrmecodemus Sloane, 1923
Neoeudalia Baehr, 2005
Odacantha Paykull, 1798
Ophionea Klug, 1821
Polydamasium Liebke, 1938
Porocara Sloane, 1917
Protocolliuris Liebke, 1931
Renneria Baehr, 1999
Smeringocera Chaudoir, 1863
Stenidia Brullé, 1834
Tricharnhemia Baehr, 2009

Subtribe Pentagonicina Bates, 1873

Parascopodes Darlington, 1968
Pentagonica Schmidt-Goebel, 1846
Scopodes Erichson, 1842

Tribe Perigonini G.Horn, 1881

Diploharpus Chaudoir, 1850
Mizotrechus Bates, 1872
Perigona Laporte, 1835
Ripogenites Basilewsky, 1954

=== Subfamily Licininae Bonelli, 1810 ===
Tribe Chaetogenyini Emden, 1958

Camptotoma Reiche, 1843

Tribe Chlaeniini Brullé, 1834

Subtribe Callistina Laporte, 1834

Callistomimus Chaudoir, 1872
Callistus Bonelli, 1810

Subtribe Chlaeniina Brullé, 1834

Actodus Alluaud, 1915
Chlaenius Bonelli, 1810
Eccoptomenus Chaudoir, 1850
Ectenognathus Murray, 1858
Globulipalpus Sciaky & Facchini, 2019
Harpaglossus Motschulsky, 1858
Hololeius LaFerté-Sénectère, 1851
Holosoma Semenov, 1889
Mirachlaenius Facchini, 2011
Parachlaenius Kolbe, 1894
Perissostomus Alluaud, 1930
Procletodema Péringuey, 1898
Procletus Péringuey, 1896
Rhopalomelus Boheman, 1848
Sphodroschema Alluaud, 1930
Stenoodes Basilewsky, 1953
Straneomelus Sciaky & Facchini, 2019
Stuhlmannium Kolbe, 1894
Viridagonum Lassalle, 2015
†Rhopalochlaenius Zhang; Sun & Zhang, 1994

Tribe Licinini Bonelli, 1810

Subtribe Dicaelina Laporte, 1834

Dicaelus Bonelli, 1813
Diplocheila Brullé, 1835

Subtribe Dicrochilina Ball, 1992

Dicrochile Guérin-Méneville, 1846

Subtribe Lestignathina Ball, 1992

Atrotus Péringuey, 1896
Dilonchus Andrewes, 1936
Hormacrus Sloane, 1898
Lacordairia Laporte, 1867
Lestignathus Erichson, 1842
Microferonia Blackburn, 1890
Microzargus Sciaky & Facchini, 1997
Platylytron W.J.MacLeay, 1873
Siagonyx W.J.MacLeay, 1871
Zargus Wollaston, 1854

Subtribe Licinina Bonelli, 1810

Badister Clairville, 1806
Colpostoma Semenov, 1889
Derostichus Motschulsky, 1860
Eurygnathus Wollaston, 1854
Eutogeneius Solier, 1849
Licinus Latreille, 1802
Omestes Andrewes, 1933
Physolaesthus Chaudoir, 1850

Tribe Oodini LaFerté-Sénectère, 1851

Subtribe Dercylina Sloane, 1923

Dercylus Laporte, 1832

Subtribe Geobaenina Péringuey, 1896

Geobaenus Dejean, 1829

Subtribe Melanchitonina Jeannel, 1948

Dicaelindus W.S.MacLeay, 1825
Melanchiton Andrewes, 1940
Melanchrous Andrewes, 1940

Subtribe Oodina LaFerté-Sénectère, 1851

Acanthoodes Basilewsky, 1953
Acutosternus Lecordier & Girard, 1988
Adelopomorpha Heller, 1916
Anatrichis LeConte, 1853
Bamaroodes Gueorguiev, 2014
Brachyodes Jeannel, 1949
Chaetocrepis Chaudoir, 1857
Coptocarpus Chaudoir, 1857
Dercylinus Chaudoir, 1883
Evolenes LeConte, 1853
Holcocoleus Chaudoir, 1883
Hoplolenus LaFerté-Sénectère, 1851
Lobatodes Basilewsky, 1956
Lonchosternus LaFerté-Sénectère, 1851
Macroprotus Chaudoir, 1878
Megaloodes Lesne, 1896
Microodes Jeannel, 1949
Miltodes Andrewes, 1922
Nanodiodes Bousquet, 1996
Neoodes Basilewsky, 1953
Nothoodes Gueorguiev & Liang, 2020
Oodes Bonelli, 1810
Oodinus Motschulsky, 1865
Orthocerodus Basilewsky, 1946
Polychaetus Chaudoir, 1882
Prionognathus LaFerté-Sénectère, 1851
Protopidius Basilewsky, 1949
Pseudoodes Gueorguiev & Liang, 2020
Pseudosphaerodes Jeannel, 1949
Simous Chaudoir, 1882
Sphaerodinus Jeannel, 1949
Sphoerodes Chaudoir, 1883
Stenocrepis Chaudoir, 1857
Sundaoodes Gueorguiev & Liang, 2020
Systolocranius Chaudoir, 1857
Thaioodes Gueorguiev, 2014
Thryptocerus Chaudoir, 1878
Trichopalpoodes B.Gueorguiev & J.Schmidt, 2016

=== Subfamily Loricerinae Bonelli, 1810 ===
Loricera Latreille, 1802

=== Subfamily Melaeninae Csiki, 1933 ===
Cymbionotum Baudi di Selve, 1864
Melaenus Dejean, 1831

=== Subfamily Migadopinae Chaudoir, 1861 ===
Tribe Amarotypini Erwin, 1985

Amarotypus Bates, 1872
Migadopiella Baehr, 2009

Tribe Migadopini Chaudoir, 1861

Antarctonomus Chaudoir, 1861
Aquilex Moret, 1989
Calathosoma Jeannel, 1938
Calyptogonia Sloane, 1920
Decogmus Sloane, 1915
Dendromigadops Baehr, 2013
Lissopterus G.R.Waterhouse, 1843
Loxomerus Chaudoir, 1842
Migadopidius Jeannel, 1938
Migadops G.R.Waterhouse, 1842
Monolobus Solier, 1849
Nebriosoma Laporte, 1867
Pseudomigadops Jeannel, 1938
Rhytidognathus Chaudoir, 1861
Stichonotus Sloane, 1910
Taenarthrus Broun, 1914

=== Subfamily Nebriinae Laporte, 1834 ===
Tribe Cicindini Csiki, 1927

Archaeocindis Kavanaugh & Erwin, 1991
Cicindis Bruch, 1908

Tribe Nebriini Laporte, 1834

Leistus Frölich, 1799
Nebria Latreille, 1802
Nippononebria Ueno, 1955
†Archaeonebria Kavanaugh & J.Schmidt, 2019
†Ledouxnebria Deuve, 1998

Tribe Notiokasiini Kavanaugh & Nègre, 1983

Notiokasis Kavanaugh & Nègre, 1983

Tribe Notiophilini Motschulsky, 1850

Notiophilus Duméril, 1805

Tribe Opisthiini Dupuis, 1912

Opisthius Kirby, 1837
Paropisthius Casey, 1920

Tribe Pelophilini Kavanaugh, 1996

Pelophila Dejean, 1821

=== Subfamily Nototylinae Bänninger, 1927 ===
Nototylus Gemminger & Harold, 1868

=== Subfamily Omophroninae Bonelli, 1810 ===
Omophron Latreille, 1802

=== Subfamily Orthogoniinae Schaum, 1857 ===
Tribe Amorphomerini Sloane, 1923

Amorphomerus Sloane, 1923

Tribe Idiomorphini Bates, 1891

Subtribe Idiomorphina Bates, 1891

Idiomorphus Chaudoir, 1846
Rathymus Dejean, 1831
Strigia Brullé, 1835

Subtribe Perochnoristhina Basilewsky, 1973

Perochnoristhus Basilewsky, 1973

Tribe Orthogoniini Schaum, 1857

Subtribe Glyptina G.Horn, 1881

Glyptus Brullé, 1837
Neoglyptus Basilewsky, 1953

Subtribe Orthogoniina Schaum, 1857

Actenoncus Chaudoir, 1872
Anoncopeucus Chaudoir, 1872
Hexachaetus Chaudoir, 1872
Neoorthogonius Tian & Deuve, 2006
Nepalorthogonius Habu, 1979
Orthogonius W.S.MacLeay, 1825

=== Subfamily Panagaeinae Bonelli, 1810 ===
Tribe Brachygnathini Basilewsky, 1946

Brachygnathus Perty, 1830

Tribe Panagaeini Bonelli, 1810

Subtribe Bascanina Basilewsky, 1953

Bascanus Péringuey, 1896

Subtribe Panagaeina Bonelli, 1810

Adischissus Fedorenko, 2015
Calathocosmus Emden, 1928
Cintaroa Kasahara, 1989
Cintaromorpha Häckel & Anichtchenko, 2016
Coptia Brullé, 1835
Craspedophorus Hope, 1838
Dischissus Bates, 1873
Epigraphodes Basilewsky, 1967
Epigraphus Chaudoir, 1869
Euschizomerus Chaudoir, 1850
Geobius Dejean, 1831
Micrixys LeConte, 1854
Microschemus Andrewes, 1940
Panagaeus Latreille, 1802
Paregraphus Basilewsky, 1967
Peronomerus Schaum, 1854
Psecadius Alluaud, 1911
Tefflus Leach in Samouelle, 1819
Tinoderus Chaudoir, 1879
Tinognathus Chaudoir, 1879
Trichisia Motschulsky, 1865

Tribe Peleciini Chaudoir, 1880

Subtribe Agonicina Sloane, 1920

Agonica Sloane, 1920
Pseudagonica B.Moore, 1960

Subtribe Peleciina Chaudoir, 1880

Ardistomopsis Straneo & Ball, 1989
Disphericus G.R.Waterhouse, 1842
Dyschiridium Chaudoir, 1861
Eripus Dejean, 1829
Pelecium Kirby, 1819
Stricteripus Straneo & Ball, 1989

=== Subfamily Patrobinae Kirby, 1837 ===
Tribe Lissopogonini Zamotajlov, 2000

Lissopogonus Andrewes, 1923

Tribe Patrobini Kirby, 1837

Subtribe Deltomerina Chaudoir, 1872

Deltomerus Motschulsky, 1850

Subtribe Deltomerodina Zamotajlov, 2002

Deltomerodes Deuve, 1992

Subtribe Patrobina Kirby, 1837

Apatrobus Habu & Baba, 1960
Apenetretus Kurnakov, 1960
Archipatrobus Zamotajlov, 1992
Caelopenetretus Zamotajlov & Ito, 2000
Chaetapatrobus Lafer, 1996
Chinapenetretus Kurnakov, 1963
Dimorphopatrobus Casale & Sciaky, 1994
Diplous Motschulsky, 1850
Grandipenetretus Zamotajlov & Sciaky, 1999
Himalopenetretus Zamotajlov, 2002
Indopatrobus Zamotajlov & Wrase, 2006
Ledouxius Zamotajlov, 1992
Minipenetretus Zamotajlov, 2002
Minypatrobus Ueno, 1955
Naxipenetretus Zamotajlov, 1999
Parapatrobus Zamotajlov, 1992
Parapenetretus Kurnakov, 1960
Patanitretus Zamotajlov, 2002
Patrobus Dejean, 1821
Penetretus Motschulsky, 1865
Platidiolus Chaudoir, 1878
Platypatrobus Darlington, 1938
Prodiplous Zamotajlov & Sciaky, 2006
Qiangopatrobus Zamotajlov, 2002
Quasipenetretus Zamotajlov, 2002
Tibetopenetretus Zamotajlov & Sciaky, 1999

=== Subfamily Paussinae Latreille, 1806 ===
Tribe Metriini LeConte, 1853

Subtribe †Kryzhanovskianina Deuve, 2019

†Kryzhanovskiana Kataev & Kirejtshuk, 2019

Metrius Eschscholtz, 1829
Sinometrius Wrase & J.Schmidt, 2006

Tribe Ozaenini Hope, 1838

Subtribe Microzaenina Deuve, 2019

Microzaena Fairmaire, 1901

Subtribe Mystropomina G.Horn, 1881

Mystropomus Chaudoir, 1848

Subtribe Ozaenina Hope, 1838

Crepidozaena Deuve, 2001
Entomoantyx Ball & McCleve, 1990
Filicerozaena Deuve, 2001
Gibbozaena Deuve, 2001
Goniotropis G.R.Gray, 1831
Inflatozaena Deuve, 2001
Mimozaena Deuve, 2001
Ozaena Olivier, 1812
Pachyteles Perty, 1830
Physea Brullé, 1835
Physeomorpha Ogueta, 1963
Platycerozaena Bänninger, 1927
Proozaena Deuve, 2001
Serratozaena Deuve, 2001
Tachypeles Deuve, 2001
Tropopsis Solier, 1849

Subtribe Pseudozaenina Sloane, 1905

Anentmetus Andrewes, 1924
Dhanya Andrewes, 1919
Eustra Schmidt-Goebel, 1846
Itamus Schmidt-Goebel, 1846
Pseudozaena Laporte, 1834
Sphaerostylus Chaudoir, 1848

Tribe Paussini Latreille, 1806

Subtribe Carabidomemnina Wasmann, 1928

Carabidomemnus Kolbe, 1924
Eohomopterus Wasmann, 1919

Subtribe Cerapterina Billberg, 1820

Arthropterus W.S.MacLeay, 1838
Cerapterus Swederus, 1788
Megalopaussus Lea, 1906
Mesarthropterus Wasmann, 1926

Subtribe Heteropaussina Janssens, 1950

Heteropaussus J.Thomson, 1860

Subtribe Homopterina Wasmann, 1920

Homopterus Westwood, 1841

Subtribe Paussina Latreille, 1806

Allorhopalus Nagel, 2017
Ceratoderus Westwood, 1841
Euplatyrhopalus Desneux, 1905
Lebioderus Westwood, 1838
Leleupaussus Luna de Carvalho, 1962
Melanospilus Westwood, 1847
Paussomorphus Raffray, 1885
Paussus Linnaeus, 1775
Platyrhopalides Wasmann, 1918
Platyrhopalopsis Desneux, 1905
Platyrhopalus Westwood, 1833
Pterorhopalus Maruyama, 2011

Subtribe Pentaplatarthrina Jeannel, 1946

Hexaplatarthrus Jeannel, 1955
Pentaplatarthrus Westwood, 1833

Subtribe †Arthropteritina Luna de Carvalho, 1961

†Arthropterites Wasmann, 1926
†Cerapterites Wasmann, 1926
†Protocerapterus Wasmann, 1926

Subtribe †Eopaussina Luna de Carvalho, 1951

†Eopaussus Wasmann, 1926

Tribe Protopaussini Gestro, 1892

Protopaussus Gestro, 1892

=== Subfamily Platyninae Bonelli, 1810 ===
Tribe Omphreini Ganglbauer, 1891

Omphreus Dejean, 1828

Tribe Platynini Bonelli, 1810

Subtribe Enoicina Basilewsky, 1985

Abacetodes Straneo, 1939
Enoicus Péringuey, 1896

Subtribe Platynina Bonelli, 1810

Achaetocephala Habu, 1975
Achaetoprothorax Habu, 1978
Aepsera Chaudoir, 1874
Agelaea Gené, 1839
Agonidium Jeannel, 1948
Agonobembix Jeannel, 1948
Agonoriascus Basilewsky, 1985
Agonorites Jeannel, 1951
Agonum Bonelli, 1810
Altagonum Darlington, 1952
Anchomenus Bonelli, 1810
Andinocolpodes Perrault, 1991
Andrewesius Andrewes, 1939
Aparupa Andrewes, 1930
Archagonum Basilewsky, 1953
Archicolpodes J.Schmidt, 2001
Arhytinus Bates, 1889
Atranodes Jedlicka, 1953
Atranus LeConte, 1847
Austroglyptolenus Roig-Juñent, 2003
Beckeria Jedlicka, 1931
Blackburnia Sharp, 1878
Bothrocolpodes Basilewsky, 1985
Bruskespar Morvan, 1998
Bruskmoal Morvan, 1998
Bryanites Valentine, 1987
Callidagonum Lorenz, 1998
Cardiomera Bassi, 1834
Catacolpodes Basilewsky, 1985
Celaenagonum Habu, 1978
Chaetagonum Burgeon, 1933
Chaetosaurus J.Schmidt, 2001
Cinctagonum Baehr, 2012
Cistelagonum Baehr, 2012
Collagonum Baehr, 1995
Colpodes W.S.MacLeay, 1825
Colpoides Jedlicka, 1931
Colpomimus Basilewsky, 1985
Colposphodrus Jedlicka, 1953
Ctenognathus Fairmaire, 1843
Cymenopterus Jeannel, 1948
Cyrtopilus Basilewsky, 1985
Dalatagonum Fedorenko, 2011
Deliaesianum Morvan, 1999
Deltocolpodes Morvan, 1992
Dendragonum Jeannel, 1948
Diacanthostylus Habu, 1978
Dicranoncoides Habu, 1978
Dicranoncus Chaudoir, 1850
Dinocolpodes J.Schmidt, 2001
Dirotus W.S.MacLeay, 1825
Dister Morvan, 2006
Dolichocolpodes Basilewsky, 1985
Dyscolus Dejean, 1831
Elliptoleus Bates, 1882
Epicolpodes Basilewsky, 1985
Eucolpodes Jeannel, 1948
Euleptus Klug, 1833
Euplynes Schmidt-Goebel, 1846
Feroniascus Jeannel, 1951
Fortagonum Darlington, 1952
Galiciotyphlotes Assmann, 1999
Gastragonum Darlington, 1952
Glaucagonum Habu, 1978
Glyptolenoides Perrault, 1991
Glyptolenus Bates, 1878
Gyrochaetostylus Habu, 1978
Habragonum Ueno, 1964
Hannaphota Landin, 1955
Haplocolpodes Jeannel, 1951
Haplopeza Boheman, 1848
Helluocolpodes Liebherr, 2005
Hemiplatynus Casey, 1920
Henvelik Morvan, 1999
Herculagonum Baehr, 2002
Hikosanoagonum Habu, 1954
Idiagonum Darlington, 1952
Idiastes Andrewes, 1931
Idiocolpodes Basilewsky, 1985
Incagonum Liebherr, 1994
Iridagonum Darlington, 1952
Ischnagonum Kasahara & Satô, 1997
Jocqueius Basilewsky, 1988
Jujiroa Ueno, 1952
Kalchdigor Morvan, 1999
Kar Morvan, 1998
Karnes Morvan, 2010
Kaszabellus Jedlicka, 1954
Kiwiplatynus Larochelle & Larivière, 2021
Klapperichella Jedlicka, 1956
Kuceraianum Morvan, 2002
Kupeplatynus Larochelle & Larivière, 2021
Laevagonum Darlington, 1952
Lassalleianum Morvan, 1999
Lepcha Andrewes, 1930
Leptagonum Kolbe, 1897
Leptocolpodes Basilewsky, 1985
Letouzeya Bruneau de Miré, 1982
Liagonum Jeannel, 1948
Liamegalonychus Basilewsky, 1963
Liocolpodes Basilewsky, 1985
Lissagonum Habu, 1978
Lithagonum Darlington, 1952
Lobocolpodes Basilewsky, 1985
Lorostema Motschulsky, 1865
Loxocrepis Eschscholtz, 1829
Lucicolpodes J.Schmidt, 2000
Maculagonum Darlington, 1952
Maoriplatynus Larochelle & Larivière, 2021
Meleagros Kirschenhofer, 1999
Mesocolpodes Basilewsky, 1985
Metacolpodes Jeannel, 1948
Mexisphodrus Barr, 1965
Montagonum Darlington, 1952
Mooreagonum Baehr, 2016
Morimotoidius Habu, 1954
Nebriagonum Darlington, 1952
Negreum Habu, 1958
Neobatenus Jeannel, 1948
Neocolpodes Jeannel, 1948
Neodendragonum Basilewsky, 1953
Neomegalonychus Jeannel, 1948
Nesiocolpodes Jeannel, 1948
Nipponagonum Habu, 1978
Notagonum Darlington, 1952
Notocolpodes Basilewsky, 1985
Notoplatynus B.Moore, 1985
Nymphagonum Habu, 1978
Olisthopus Dejean, 1828
Oncostylus Habu, 1978
Onotokiba Alluaud, 1927
Onycholabis Bates, 1873
Onypterygia Dejean, 1831
Orophicus Alluaud, 1925
Orthotrichus Peyron, 1856
Oxygonium Basilewsky, 1951
Oxypselaphus Chaudoir, 1843
Pachybatenus Basilewsky, 1973
Pachyferonia Jeannel, 1951
Paracolpodes Basilewsky, 1985
Paraliagonum Basilewsky, 1957
Paramegalonychus Basilewsky, 1953
Paranchodemus Habu, 1978
Paranchus Lindroth, 1974
Paraplatynus Baehr, 2016
Pawgammm Morvan, 1999
Platyagonum Habu, 1978
Platynus Bonelli, 1810
Plaumannium Liebke, 1939
Plicagonum Darlington, 1952
Ponapagonum Darlington, 1970
Potamagonum Darlington, 1952
Praepristus Kirschenhofer, 1999
Promecoptera Dejean, 1831
Promegalonychus Basilewsky, 1953
Prophenorites Basilewsky, 1985
Prosphodrus Britton, 1959
Protocolpodes Basilewsky, 1985
Pseudanchomenus Tarnier, 1860
Pseudobatenus Basilewsky, 1951
Pseudomegalonychus Basilewsky, 1950
Rhadine LeConte, 1846
Rupa Jedlicka, 1935
Scotagonum Habu, 1978
Sericoda Kirby, 1837
Shibataia Habu, 1978
Sinocolpodes J.Schmidt, 2001
Skoeda Morvan, 1995
Skorlagad Morvan, 1999
Skouedhirraad Morvan, 1999
Sophroferonia Alluaud, 1933
Speagonum B.Moore, 1977
Speocolpodes Barr, 1974
Speokokosia Alluaud, 1932
Sperkanhir Morvan, 2010
Stenocnemus Mannerheim, 1837
Straneoa Basilewsky, 1953
Syletor Tschitscherine, 1899
Takasagoagonum Habu, 1977
Tanystoma Motschulsky, 1845
Tarsagonum Darlington, 1952
Tetraleucus Casey, 1920
Tostkar Morvan, 1998
Trogloagonum Casale, 1982
Tuiplatynus Larochelle & Larivière, 2021
Vitagonum B.Moore, 1999
Vulcanophilus Heller, 1898
Xestagonum Habu, 1978
†Praeanchodemus J.Schmidt; Göpel & Will, 2017

Tribe Sphodrini Laporte, 1834

Subtribe Atranopsina Baehr, 1982

Amaroschema Jeannel, 1943
Amphimasoreus Piochard de la Brûlerie, 1875
Atranopsis Baehr, 1982
Broter Andrewes, 1923
Gomerina Bolivar y Pieltain, 1940
Paraeutrichopus Mateu, 1954
Platyderus Stephens, 1827
Pseudomyas Uyttenboogaart, 1929
Pseudoplatyderus Bolivar y Pieltain, 1940

Subtribe Calathina Laporte, 1834

Calathus Bonelli, 1810
Thermoscelis Putzeys, 1873

Subtribe Dolichina Brullé, 1834

Acalathus Semenov, 1889
Anchomenidius Heyden, 1880
Casaleius Sciaky & Wrase, 1998
Dolichus Bonelli, 1810
Doliodactyla Sciaky & Wrase, 1998
Morphodactyla Semenov, 1889
Xestopus Andrewes, 1937

Subtribe Pristosiina Lindroth, 1956

Pristosia Motschulsky, 1865

Subtribe Sphodrina Laporte, 1834

Calathidius Putzeys, 1873
Cephalosdrophus Lassalle & Marcilhac, 1999
Eosphodrus Casale, 1988
Eremosphodrus Semenov, 1909
Himalosphodrus Casale, 1988
Hystricosphodrus Casale & Giachino, 2004
Ifridytes Deuve & Queinnec, 1994
Laemostenus Bonelli, 1810
Licinopsis Bedel, 1899
Miquihuana Barr, 1982
Pseudotaphoxenus L.Schaufuss, 1865
Reflexisphodrus Casale, 1988
Sphodropsis Seidlitz, 1887
Sphodrus Clairville, 1806
Stenolepta Semenov, 1889
Taphoxenus Motschulsky, 1850

Subtribe Synuchina Lindroth, 1956

Nipponosynuchus Morita, 1998
Parabroscus Lindroth, 1956
Synuchus Gyllenhal, 1810
Trephionus Bates, 1883

=== Subfamily Promecognathinae LeConte, 1853 ===
Tribe Axinidiini Basilewsky, 1963

Axinidium Sturm, 1843
Holaxinidium Basilewsky, 1963
Metaxinidium Basilewsky, 1963
Paraxinidium Basilewsky, 1963

Tribe Dalyatini Mateu, 2002

Dalyat Mateu, 2002

Tribe Promecognathini LeConte, 1853

Promecognathus Chaudoir, 1846

Tribe †Palaeoaxinidiini McKay, 1991

†Palaeoaxinidium McKay, 1991

=== Subfamily Pseudomorphinae Hope, 1838 ===
Adelotopus Hope, 1836
Cainogenion Notman, 1925
Cryptocephalomorpha Ritsema, 1875
Guyanemorpha Erwin, 2013
Manumorpha Erwin & Geraci, 2008
Notopseudomorpha Baehr, 1997
Paussotropus C.O.Waterhouse, 1877
Pseudomorpha Kirby, 1823
Samiriamorpha Erwin & Geraci, 2008
Sphallomorpha Westwood, 1840
Tuxtlamorpha Erwin & Geraci, 2008
Yasunimorpha Erwin & Geraci, 2008

=== Subfamily Psydrinae LeConte, 1853 ===
Tribe Gehringiini Darlington, 1933

Subtribe Gehringiina Darlington, 1933

Gehringia Darlington, 1933

Subtribe Helenaeina Deuve, 2007

Afrogehringia Baehr; Schüle & Lorenz, 2009
Helenaea Schatzmayr & Koch, 1934

Tribe Moriomorphini Sloane, 1890

Subtribe Amblytelina Blackburn, 1892

Amblytelus Erichson, 1842
Dystrichothorax Blackburn, 1892
Epelyx Blackburn, 1892
Mecyclothorax Sharp, 1903
Meonis Laporte, 1867
Paratrichothorax Baehr, 2004
Pseudamblytelus Baehr, 2004
Raphetis B.Moore, 1963
Selenochilus Chaudoir, 1878
Trichamblytelus Baehr, 2004

Subtribe Moriomorphina Sloane, 1890

Celanida Laporte, 1867
Melisodera Westwood, 1835
Molopsida White, 1846
Moriodema Laporte, 1867
Moriomorpha Laporte, 1867
Neonomius B.Moore, 1963
Pterogmus Sloane, 1920
Rhaebolestes Sloane, 1903
Rossjoycea Liebherr, 2011
Sitaphe B.Moore, 1963
Spherita Liebherr, 2020
Tarastethus Sharp, 1883
Teraphis Laporte, 1867
Theprisa B.Moore, 1963
Trephisa B.Moore, 1963
Trichopsida Larochelle & Larivière, 2013

Subtribe Tropopterina Sloane, 1898

Pharetis Liebherr, 2020
Tropopterus Solier, 1849

Tribe Psydrini LeConte, 1853

Laccocenus Sloane, 1890
Nomius Laporte, 1835
Psydrus LeConte, 1846

=== Subfamily Pterostichinae Bonelli, 1810 ===
Tribe Chaetodactylini Tschitscherine, 1903

Chaetodactyla Tschitscherine, 1897

Tribe Cnemalobini Germain, 1911

Cnemalobus Guérin-Méneville, 1838

Tribe Cratocerini Lacordaire, 1854

Subtribe Catapieseina Bates, 1882

Catapiesis Solier, 1835
Homalomorpha Brullé, 1837

Subtribe Cratocerina Lacordaire, 1854

Brachidius Chaudoir, 1852
Cratocerus Dejean, 1829
Oxyglychus Straneo, 1938

Subtribe Drimostomatina Chaudoir, 1873

Abacaelostus Straneo, 1952
Andrewesinulus Straneo, 1938
Apsidocnemus Alluaud, 1936
Barylaus Liebherr, 1985
Caecocaelus Straneo, 1949
Caelostomus W.S.MacLeay, 1825
Camptogenys Tschitscherine, 1899
Capabatus Csiki, 1930
Crenulostrigus Straneo, 1942
Cyrtolaus Bates, 1882
Dactyleurys Tschitscherine, 1899
Dactylinius Straneo, 1941
Diachipteryx Alluaud, 1925
Diceromerus Chaudoir, 1873
Dromistomus Jeannel, 1948
Drymonaxus Straneo, 1941
Feostoma Straneo, 1941
Hemitelestus Alluaud, 1895
Hoplizomenus Chaudoir, 1873
Leleuporites Straneo, 1960
Madapelmus Dajoz, 1985
Monodryxus Straneo, 1942
Pachycaecus Straneo, 1971
Pachyroxochus Straneo, 1942
Platyxythrius Lorenz, 1998
Stegazopteryx Will, 2004
Stomonaxellus Tschitscherine, 1901
Strigomerodes Straneo, 1939
Strigomerus Chaudoir, 1873
Trichillinus Straneo, 1938

Tribe Microcheilini Jeannel, 1948

Microcheila Brullé, 1835

Tribe Morionini Brullé, 1837

Buderes Murray, 1857
Hyperectenus Alluaud, 1935
Hyperion Laporte, 1834
Megamorio Chaudoir, 1880
Morion Latreille, 1810
Morionidius Chaudoir, 1880
Moriosomus Motschulsky, 1855
Platynodes Westwood, 1847
Stereostoma Murray, 1857

Tribe Pterostichini Bonelli, 1810

Subtribe Abacetina Chaudoir, 1873

Abacaecus Allegro & Giachino, 2020
Abacetus Dejean, 1828
Aristopus LaFerté-Sénectère, 1853
Celioinkosa Straneo, 1951
Chlaeminus Motschulsky, 1865
Colpodichius Straneo, 1952
Cosmodiscus Sloane, 1907
Cyrtomoscelis Chaudoir, 1874
Distrigidius Jeannel, 1948
Ecnomolaus Bates, 1892
Haptoderidius Straneo, 1975
Haptoderodes Straneo, 1986
Holconotus Schmidt-Goebel, 1846
Inkosa Péringuey, 1926
Mateuellus Deuve, 1990
Metabacetus Bates, 1892
Metaxellus Straneo, 1960
Metaxys Chaudoir, 1857
Novillidius Straneo, 1941
Oodinkosa Straneo, 1939
Ophonichius Straneo, 1942
Pediomorphus Chaudoir, 1878
Pioprosopus Tschitscherine, 1899
Pollicobius Vinson, 1939
Prostalomus Basilewsky, 1950
Pseudabacetus Burgeon, 1935
Pterostillichus Straneo, 1949
Rhagadillius Straneo, 1951
Tiferonia Darlington, 1962
Trachelocyphoides Straneo, 1942
Trachelocyphus Tschitscherine, 1900

Subtribe Euchroina Chaudoir, 1874

Abacillius Straneo, 1949
Abacillodes Straneo, 1988
Abaris Dejean, 1831
Apsaustodon Tschitscherine, 1901
Argutoridius Chaudoir, 1876
Blennidus Motschulsky, 1866
Blenniventer Straneo, 1986
Bothynoproctus Tschitscherine, 1900
Cedrorum Borges & A.Serrano, 1993
Cephalostichus Straneo, 1977
Cynthidia Chaudoir, 1874
Euchroa Brullé, 1835
Eumara Tschitscherine, 1901
Gastrogmus Sloane, 1915
Haplobothynus Tschitscherine, 1901
Litarthrum Sloane, 1915
Lobobrachus Sharp, 1885
Marsyas Putzeys, 1845
Meropalpus Tschitscherine, 1900
Microcephalus Dejean, 1828
Neotalus Will, 2002
Oribazus Chaudoir, 1874
Orthomus Chaudoir, 1838
Pachythecus Chaudoir, 1874
Paniestichus Will, 2011
Parorthomus B.Gueorguiev; Wrase & Farkac, 2014
Phaenaulax Tschitscherine, 1898
Prosopogmus Chaudoir, 1865
Pseudabarys Chaudoir, 1874
Setalimorphus Sloane, 1895
Setalis Laporte, 1867
Simodontus Chaudoir, 1843
Trirammatus Chaudoir, 1835

Subtribe Loxandrina Erwin & Sims, 1984

Cerabilia Laporte, 1867
Oxycrepis Reiche, 1843
Zeodera Laporte, 1867

Subtribe Metiina Straneo, 1951

Abropus G.R.Waterhouse, 1842
Antarctiola Straneo, 1977
Feroniola Tschitscherine, 1900
Kuschelinus Straneo, 1963
Metius Curtis, 1839

Subtribe Pterostichina Bonelli, 1810

Abacidus LeConte, 1863
Abacoleptus Fauvel, 1903
Abacomorphus Chaudoir, 1878
Abacophrastus Will, 2011
Abacops Tschitscherine, 1902
Abax Bonelli, 1810
Allotriopus Bates, 1882
Analoma Darlington, 1971
Apophylon B.Gueorguiev & Sciaky, 2015
Aristochroa Tschitscherine, 1898
Aristochroodes Marcilhac, 1993
Aulacopodus Britton, 1940
Basilewskya Straneo, 1948
Camptoscelis Dejean, 1828
Castelnaudia Tschitscherine, 1891
Catadromus W.S.MacLeay, 1825
Chaetauchenium Tschitscherine, 1900
Chalcochrous Chaudoir, 1838
Cophosomorpha Tschitscherine, 1891
Cratoferonia Tschitscherine, 1902
Cratogaster Blanchard, 1843
Cuneipectus Sloane, 1907
Cyclotrachelus Chaudoir, 1838
Cyrtoderus Hope, 1842
Darodilia Laporte, 1867
Delinius Westwood, 1864
Eucamptognathus Chaudoir, 1837
Eudromus Klug, 1835
Euryabax Fauvel, 1903
Euryaptus Bates, 1892
Eurypercus Jeannel, 1948
Eurystomis Chaudoir, 1878
Gastrellarius Casey, 1918
Gourlayia Britton, 1964
Harpostomus Chaudoir, 1856
Henrotiochoromus Busulini, 1958
Henrotius Jeannel, 1953
Holcaspis Chaudoir, 1865
Hybothecus Chaudoir, 1874
Leiolesticus Roux; Lassalle & Dubault, 2016
Lesticus Dejean, 1828
Licentius Jedlicka, 1939
Liopasa Tschitscherine, 1901
Lophoglossus LeConte, 1853
Loxogenius Sloane, 1907
Mecynognathus W.J.MacLeay, 1873
Megadromus Motschulsky, 1866
Molopidius Jeannel, 1942
Molopinus Jeannel, 1948
Molops Bonelli, 1810
Myas Sturm, 1826
Neoferonia Britton, 1940
Nesites Andrewes, 1939
Nirmala Andrewes, 1930
Notabax B.Moore, 1976
Notolestus Sloane, 1894
Notonomus Chaudoir, 1865
Nurus Motschulsky, 1866
Oberthueria Vuillet, 1911
Ogmophora Tschitscherine, 1896
Onawea Johns, 2007
Oscadytes Lagar Mascaro, 1975
Pachymorphus Chaudoir, 1838
Paranurus Tschitscherine, 1901
Pareuryaptus Dubault; Lassalle & Roux, 2008
Parhypates Motschulsky, 1866
Pedius Motschulsky, 1850
Percolaus Bates, 1882
Percus Bonelli, 1810
Peyrieraselus Deuve, 1981
Piesmus LeConte, 1846
Platycoelus Blanchard, 1843
Platysmodes Fauvel, 1903
Plocamostethus Britton, 1940
Poecilinus Jeannel, 1948
Poecilus Bonelli, 1810
Pseudoceneus Tschitscherine, 1891
Pterostichus Bonelli, 1810
Rhabdotus Chaudoir, 1865
Rhytiferonia Darlington, 1962
Rhytisternus Chaudoir, 1865
Sarticus Motschulsky, 1866
Secatophus Laporte, 1867
Setalidius Chaudoir, 1878
Speluncarius Reitter, 1886
Speomolops Patrizi, 1955
Sphodrosomus Perroud, 1864
Stenochoromus L.Miller, 1866
Stereocerus Kirby, 1837
Sthenocranion Tschitscherine, 1899
Stomis Clairville, 1806
Straneostichus Sciaky, 1994
Styracoderus Chaudoir, 1874
Tanythrix Schaum, 1858
Taphoxomimus Straneo, 1975
Tapinopterus Schaum, 1858
Teratotarsa Tschitscherine, 1893
Teropha Laporte, 1867
Trichosternus Chaudoir, 1865
Trigonaptus Fedorenko, 2020
Trigonotoma Dejean, 1828
Troglorites Jeannel, 1919
Tropidocerus Chaudoir, 1878
Typhlochoromus Moczarski, 1913
Wahlbergiana Bousquet, 2002
Xenion Tschitscherine, 1902
Zariquieya Jeannel, 1924
Zeopoecilus Sharp, 1886

Tribe Zabrini Bonelli, 1810

Subtribe Amarina Zimmermann, 1832

Amara Bonelli, 1810
Pseudamara Lindroth, 1968

Subtribe Zabrina Bonelli, 1810

Zabrus Clairville, 1806

=== Subfamily Rhysodinae Laporte, 1840 ===
Tribe Clinidiini R.T. & J.R.Bell, 1978

Clinidium Kirby, 1830
Grouvellina R.T. & J.R.Bell, 1978
Rhyzodiastes Fairmaire, 1895

Tribe Dhysorini R.T. & J.R.Bell, 1978

Dhysores Grouvelle, 1903
Neodhysores R.T. & J.R.Bell, 1978
Tangarona R.T. & J.R.Bell, 1982

Tribe Leoglymmiini R.T. & J.R.Bell, 1978

Leoglymmius R.T. & J.R.Bell, 1978

Tribe Medisorini R.T. & J.R.Bell, 1987

Medisores R.T. & J.R.Bell, 1987

Tribe Omoglymmiini R.T. & J.R.Bell, 1978

Arrowina R.T. & J.R.Bell, 1978
Omoglymmius Ganglbauer, 1891
Plesioglymmius R.T. & J.R.Bell, 1978
Shyrodes Grouvelle, 1903
Srimara R.T. & J.R.Bell, 1978
Xhosores R.T. & J.R.Bell, 1978
Yamatosa R.T. & J.R.Bell, 1979

Tribe Rhysodini Laporte, 1840

Kaveinga R.T. & J.R.Bell, 1978
Kupeus R.T. & J.R.Bell, 1982
Rhysodes Germar, 1822

Tribe Sloanoglymmiini R.T. & J.R.Bell, 1991

Sloanoglymmius R.T. & J.R.Bell, 1991

=== Subfamily Scaritinae Bonelli, 1810 ===
Tribe Clivinini Rafinesque, 1815

Subtribe Androzelmina R.T.Bell, 1998

Androzelma Dostal, 1993

Subtribe Ardistomina Putzeys, 1867

Ardistomis Putzeys, 1846
Aspidoglossa Putzeys, 1846
Kearophus Dajoz, 2004
Semiardistomis Kult, 1950

Subtribe Clivinina Rafinesque, 1815

Afrosyleter Basilewsky, 1959
Ancus Putzeys, 1867
Basilewskyana Kult, 1959
Brachypelus Putzeys, 1867
Cameroniola Baehr, 2000
Climax Putzeys, 1861
Clivina Latreille, 1802
Clivinarchus Sloane, 1896
Cryptomma Putzeys, 1846
Lachenus Putzeys, 1846
Leleuporella Basilewsky, 1956
Nannoryctes Baehr, 2000
Nyctosyles Putzeys, 1867
Orictites Andrewes, 1931
Platysphyrus Sloane, 1905
Psilidius Jeannel, 1957
Pyramoides Bousquet, 2002
Rhysocara Sloane, 1916
Rubidiclivina Baehr, 2015
Rugiluclivina Balkenohl, 1996
Semiclivina Kult, 1947
Sinesetosa Balkenohl, 1996
Syleter Andrewes, 1941
Thliboclivina Kult, 1959
Trilophidius Jeannel, 1957
Trilophus Andrewes, 1927
Trogloclivina Deuve, 2003
Whiteheadiana Perrault, 1994

Subtribe Forcipatorina Bänninger, 1938

Camptidius Putzeys, 1867
Camptodontus Dejean, 1826
Forcipator Maindron, 1904
Kultianella Perrault, 1994
Mesus Chevrolat, 1858
Obadius Burmeister, 1875
Oxygnathopsis Louwerens, 1953
Oxygnathus Dejean, 1826
Scolyptus Putzeys, 1861
Stratiotes Putzeys, 1846

Subtribe Reicheiina Jeannel, 1957

Alpiodytes Jeannel, 1957
Asioreicheia Bulirsch & Magrini, 2014
Catalanodytes Sciaky, 1989
Dalmatoreicheia Magrini & Bulirsch, 2005
Dimorphoreicheia Magrini; Fancello & Leo, 2002
Galicioreicheia Felix & Bulirsch, 2015
Guiodytes Tian, 2013
Gymnetoreicheia Magrini; Fancello & Casale, 2019
Iberodytes Jeannel, 1949
Ichnusodytes Magrini; Fancello & Onnis, 2019
Italodytes G.Müller, 1938
Kenyoreicheia Bulirsch & Magrini, 2007
Laoreicheia Balkenohl, 2005
Madagascareicheia Magrini & Bulirsch, 2009
Malagasyreicheia Magrini; Bulirsch & Fancello, 2021
Orientoreicheia Bulirsch & Hurka, 1994
Oxydrepanus Putzeys, 1867
Parareicheia Jeannel, 1957
Reicheadella Reitter, 1913
Reicheia Saulcy, 1862
Reicheidius Jeannel, 1957
Sikelioreicheia Magrini & Fancello, 2019
Spelaeodytes L.Miller, 1863
Typhloreicheia Holdhaus, 1924

Subtribe Schizogeniina Dostal, 2017

Baehrogenius Dostal, 2017
Coryza Putzeys, 1867
Halocoryza Alluaud, 1919
Lophocoryza Alluaud, 1941
Paracoryza Basilewsky, 1952
Psammocoryza Hogan, 2006
Schizogenius Putzeys, 1846

Subtribe Sparostesina Dostal, 2017

Bohemaniella Bousquet, 2002
Pseudoclivina Kult, 1947
Sparostes Putzeys, 1867

Tribe Corintascarini Basilewsky, 1973

Corintascaris Basilewsky, 1952

Tribe Dyschiriini Kolbe, 1880

Akephorus LeConte, 1852
Caledyschirius Bulirsch, 2010
Clivinopsis Bedel, 1895
Cribrodyschirius Bruneau de Miré, 1952
Dyschirius Bonelli, 1810
Neodyschirius Kult, 1954
Reicheiodes Ganglbauer, 1891
Setodyschirius Fedorenko, 1996
Striganoviella Fedorenko, 2012
Torretassoa Schatzmayr & Koch, 1933
†Dyschiriomimus Iablokoff-Khnzorian, 1960

Tribe Salcediini Alluaud, 1930

Subtribe Salcediina Alluaud, 1930

Salcedia Fairmaire, 1899

Subtribe Solenogenyina R.T.Bell, 1998

Holoprizus Putzeys, 1867
Solenogenys Westwood, 1859

Tribe Scaritini Bonelli, 1810

Subtribe Carenina W.J.MacLeay, 1887

Carenidium Chaudoir, 1868
Carenum Bonelli, 1813
Epilectus Blackburn, 1888
Euryscaphus W.J.MacLeay, 1865
Laccopterum W.J.MacLeay, 1878
Monocentrum Chaudoir, 1868
Mouhotia Laporte, 1862
Neocarenum Laporte, 1867
Neoscaphus Sloane, 1888
Philoscaphus W.J.MacLeay, 1871
Scaraphites Westwood, 1842
Trichocarenum Blackburn, 1892

Subtribe Pasimachina Putzeys, 1867

Pasimachus Bonelli, 1813

Subtribe Scapterina Putzeys, 1867

Acanthoscelis Dejean, 1825
Oxylobus Chaudoir, 1855
Parathlibops Basilewsky, 1958
Passalidius Chaudoir, 1863
Scapterus Dejean, 1826
Steganomma W.J.MacLeay, 1887
Thlibops Putzeys, 1867

Subtribe Scaritina Bonelli, 1810

Anomophaenus Fauvel, 1882
Antilliscaris Lorenz, 1998
Baenningeria Reichardt, 1976
Coptolobus Chaudoir, 1857
Crepidopterus Chaudoir, 1855
Cryptoscaphus Chaudoir, 1855
Dinoscaris Alluaud, 1902
Distichus Motschulsky, 1858
Dyscaris Bänninger, 1940
Dyscherinus Jeannel, 1955
Dyscherus Chaudoir, 1855
Geoscaptus Chaudoir, 1855
Glyptogrus Bates, 1875
Gnaphon Andrewes, 1920
Haplogaster Chaudoir, 1879
Haplotrachelus Chaudoir, 1855
Macromorphus Chaudoir, 1857
Madascaris Bänninger, 1938
Mamboicus Bates, 1886
Mecynoscaris Alluaud, 1930
Menigius Chaudoir, 1879
Neochryopus Bänninger, 1932
Ochyropus Schiödte, 1847
Pachyodontus Chaudoir, 1879
Paradyscherus Basilewsky, 1971
Pilades Heyne, 1895
Prodyscherodes Jeannel, 1955
Prodyscherus Jeannel, 1946
Scarites Fabricius, 1775
Storthodontus Chaudoir, 1855
Tapinoscaris Jeannel, 1946
Tibioscarites Bänninger, 1929
Tonkinoscaris Bänninger, 1956
Typhloscaris Kuntzen, 1914

=== Subfamily Siagoninae Bonelli, 1813 ===
Tribe Enceladini G.Horn, 1881

Enceladus Bonelli, 1813

Tribe Siagonini Bonelli, 1813

Luperca Laporte, 1840
Siagona Latreille, 1804

=== Subfamily Trechinae Bonelli, 1810 ===
Tribe Bembidarenini Maddison et al., 2019

Andinodontis Erwin & Toledano, 2010
Argentinatachoides Sallanave; Erwin & Roig-Juñent, 2008
Bembidarenas Erwin, 1972
Tasmanitachoides Erwin, 1972

Tribe Bembidiini Stephens, 1827

Subtribe Anillina Jeannel, 1937

Afranillus Giachino, 2015
Afrodipnus Giachino, 2015
Angustanillus Baehr & Main, 2016
Anillaspis Casey, 1918
Anillinus Casey, 1918
Anillodes Jeannel, 1963
Anillopsidius Coiffait, 1969
Anillopsis Jeannel, 1937
Anillotarsus Mateu, 1980
Anillus Jacquelin du Val, 1851
Argiloborus Jeannel, 1937
Austranillus Giachino, 2005
Bafutyphlus Bruneau de Miré, 1986
Bhutanillus M.E.Schmid, 1975
Bulirschia Giachino, 2008
Bylibaraphanus Giachino; Eberhard & Perina, 2021
Caeconannus Jeannel, 1963
Caecoparvus Jeannel, 1937
Carayonites Bruneau de Miré, 1986
Cryptocharidius M.Etonti & Mateu, 1992
Cryptorites Jeannel, 1950
Dicropterus Ehlers, 1883
Elgonotyphlus Sciaky & Zaballos, 1993
Erwinanillus Giachino; Eberhard & Perina, 2021
Externanillus Baehr & Main, 2016
Geocharidius Jeannel, 1963
Geocharis Ehlers, 1883
Gilesdytes Giachino; Eberhard & Perina, 2021
Gracilanillus Baehr & Main, 2016
Gregorydytes Giachino; Eberhard & Perina, 2021
Hesperanillus Baehr & Main, 2016
Honduranillus Zaballos, 1997
Hygranillus B.Moore, 1980
Hypodipnites Jeannel, 1963
Hypotyphlus Jeannel, 1937
Iason Giachino & Vailati, 2011
Iberanillus Español, 1971
Illaphanus W.J.MacLeay, 1865
Kimberleytyphlus Giachino; Eberhard & Perina, 2021
Leleupanillus Basilewsky, 1976
Magnanillus Baehr, 2017
Malagasydipnus Giachino, 2008
Malagasytyphlus Giachino, 2008
Megastylulus Giachino & Sciaky, 2003
Mexanillus Vigna Taglianti, 1973
Microdipnites Jeannel, 1957
Microdipnodes Basilewsky, 1960
Microdipnus Jeannel, 1937
Microtyphlus Linder, 1863
Mystroceridius Reichardt, 1972
Neodipnus Jeannel, 1957
Neoillaphanus Giachino; Eberhard & Perina, 2021
Nesamblyops Jeannel, 1937
Nothanillus Jeannel, 1962
Orthotyphlus Mateu & Zaballos, 1998
Paranillopsis Cicchino & Roig-Juñent, 2001
Paranillus Jeannel, 1949
Parillaphanus Baehr, 2018
Parvocaecus Coiffait, 1956
Pelocharis Jeannel, 1960
Pelodiaetodes B.Moore, 1980
Pelodiaetus Jeannel, 1937
Pelonomites Jeannel, 1963
Perucharidius Mateu & M.Etonti, 2002
Pilbaradytes Giachino; Eberhard & Perina, 2021
Pilbaranillus Baehr & Main, 2016
Pilbaraphanus Giachino; Eberhard & Perina, 2021
Prioniomus Jeannel, 1937
Pseudanillus Bedel, 1896
Pseudillaphanus Giachino, 2005
Rhegmatobius Jeannel, 1937
Scotodipnus Schaum, 1860
Selenodipnus Jeannel, 1963
Serranillus Barr, 1995
Serratotyphlus Giachino, 2008
Stylulus L.Schaufuss, 1882
Tasmanillus Giachino, 2005
Typhlocharis Dieck, 1869
Typhlonesiotes Jeannel, 1937
Winklerites Jeannel, 1937
Zapotecanillus Sokolov, 2013
Zeanillus Jeannel, 1937
Zoianillus Sciaky, 1994

Subtribe Bembidiina Stephens, 1827

Amerizus Chaudoir, 1868
Asaphidion Gozis, 1886
Bembidion Latreille, 1802
Caecidium Ueno, 1971
Lionepha Casey, 1918
Ocys Stephens, 1828
Orzolina Machado, 1987
Sinechostictus Motschulsky, 1864

Subtribe Horologionina Jeannel, 1949

Horologion Valentine, 1932

Subtribe Lovriciina Giachino; B.Gueorguiev & Vailati, 2011

Lovricia Pretner, 1979
Neolovricia Lakota; Jalzic & J.Moravec, 2009
Paralovricia Giachino; B.Gueorguiev & Vailati, 2011

Subtribe Tachyina Motschulsky, 1862

Aenigmatachys Baehr, 2020
Afrotachys Basilewsky, 1958
Anomotachys Jeannel, 1946
Costitachys Erwin, 1974
Elaphropus Motschulsky, 1839
Kiwitachys Larochelle & Larivière, 2007
Liotachys Bates, 1871
Lymnastis Motschulsky, 1862
Meotachys Erwin, 1974
Micratopus Casey, 1914
Moirainpa Erwin, 1984
Nothoderis Boyd & Erwin, 2016
Pericompsus LeConte, 1852
Polyderidius Jeannel, 1962
Porotachys Netolitzky, 1914
Setitachys Baehr, 2016
Stigmatachys Boyd & Erwin, 2016
Straneoites Basilewsky, 1947
Tachys Dejean, 1821
Tachysbembix Erwin, 2004
Tachyta Kirby, 1837
Tachyxysta Boyd & Erwin, 2016

Subtribe Xystosomina Erwin, 1994

Erwiniana Paulsen & A.Smith, 2003
Geballusa Erwin, 1994
Gouleta Erwin, 1994
Inpa Erwin, 1978
Mioptachys Bates, 1882
Philipis Erwin, 1994
Xystosomus Schaum, 1863

Tribe Pogonini Laporte, 1834

Bedeliolus Semenov, 1900
Cardiaderus Dejean, 1828
Diodercarus Lutshnik, 1931
Diplochaetus Chaudoir, 1872
Ochtozetus Chaudoir, 1872
Olegius Komarov, 1996
Pogonistes Chaudoir, 1872
Pogonopsis Bedel, 1898
Pogonus Dejean, 1821
Sirdenus Dejean, 1828
Syrdenoidius Baehr & Hudson, 2001
Thalassotrechus Van Dyke, 1918

Tribe Sinozolini Deuve, 1997

Chaltenia Roig-Juñent & Cicchino, 2001
Phrypeus Casey, 1924
Sinozolus Deuve, 1997

Tribe Trechini Bonelli, 1810

Subtribe Aepina Fowler, 1887

Aepopsis Jeannel, 1922
Aepus Leach in Samouelle, 1819
Kenodactylus Broun, 1909
Kiwitrechus Larochelle & Larivière, 2007
Maoritrechus Brookes, 1932
Neanops Britton, 1962
Oarotrechus Townsend, 2010
Temnostega Enderlein, 1905
Thalassobius Solier, 1849
Waiputrechus Townsend, 2010

Subtribe Perileptina Sloane, 1903

Apoplotrechus Alluaud, 1915
Neoblemus Jeannel, 1923
Perileptus Schaum, 1860

Subtribe Trechina Bonelli, 1810

Accoella Ueno, 1990
Acheroniotes Lohaj & Lakota, 2010
Adriaphaenops Noesske, 1928
Aepiblemus Belousov & Kabak, 1993
Agonotrechus Jeannel, 1923
Agostinia Jeannel, 1928
Alanorites Belousov, 1998
Albanotrechus Casale & V.B.Gueorguiev, 1994
Allegrettia Jeannel, 1928
Allotrechiama Ueno, 1970
Ameroduvalius Valentine, 1952
Anchotrechus Jeannel, 1927
Andinorites Mateu & Belles, 1980
Andinotrechus Mateu, 1981
Anillidius Jeannel, 1928
Anophthalmus Sturm, 1844
Aphaenopidius G.Müller, 1913
Aphaenops Bonvouloir, 1862
Aphaenopsis G.Müller, 1913
Apocimmerites Belousov, 1998
Apoduvalius Jeannel, 1953
Aputrechisibus Trezzi, 2007
Arctaphaenops Meixner, 1925
Aspidaphaenops Ueno, 2006
Austrotrechus B.Moore, 1972
Awatrechus Ueno, 1955
Balazucellus Deuve, 2001
Bathytrechus Ueno, 2005
Beronaphaenops B.V.Gueorguiev, 2012
Birmaphaenops Deuve, 2017
Blemus Dejean, 1821
Boldoriella Jeannel, 1928
Boreaphaenops Ueno, 2002
Bothynotrechus B.Moore, 1972
Casaleaphaenops Tian; Huang & Ma, 2021
Cathaiaphaenops Deuve, 1996
Caucasaphaenops Belousov, 1999
Caucasorites Belousov & Zamotajlov, 1997
Chaetoduvalius Jeannel, 1928
Chaetotrechiama Ueno, 1982
Chiapadytes Vigna Taglianti, 1977
Chu Tian & He, 2020
Cimbrodytes Piva, 2021
Cimmerites Jeannel, 1928
Cimmeritodes Deuve, 1996
Ckacus Tian & Huang, 2021
Columbitrechus Mateu, 1982
Coreoblemus Ueno, 1969
Croatotrechus Casale & Jalzic, 1999
Dabatrechus Ueno, 2004
Dactylotrechus Belousov & Kabak, 2003
Daiconotrechus Ueno, 1971
Dalmataphaenops Monguzzi, 1993
Darlingtonea Valentine, 1952
Derossiella Queinnec, 2008
Deuveaphaenops Tian & Huang, 2017
Dianotrechus Tian, 2016
Doderotrechus Vigna Taglianti, 1968
Dongoblemus Deuve & Tian, 2016
Dongodytes Deuve, 1993
Dracotrechus Ueno, 2010
Duvalioblemus Deuve, 1995
Duvaliomimus Jeannel, 1928
Duvaliopsis Jeannel, 1928
Duvalius Delarouzée, 1859
Eocnides Jeannel, 1954
Epaphiopsis Ueno, 1953
Epaphiotrechus Deuve & Kavanaugh, 2016
Epaphius Leach in Samouelle, 1819
Erebotrechus Britton, 1964
Escolatrechus Mateu, 2003
Eutrechopsis B.Moore, 1972
Eutrechus B.Moore, 1972
Geotrechus Jeannel, 1919
Giraffaphaenops Deuve, 2002
Glabroduvalius Vrbica; Curcic; Antic & Curcic, 2013
Goedetrechus B.Moore, 1972
Gotoblemus Ueno, 1970
Graciliblemus Deuve & Tian, 2016
Guatemalatrechus Trezzi, 2003
Guiaphaenops Deuve, 2002
Guizhaphaenops Vigna Taglianti, 1997
Guizhaphaenopsoides Tian; Huang & Li, 2021
Gulaphaenops Ueno, 1987
Himalaphaenops Ueno, 1980
Himalotrechus Belousov; Kabak & J.Schmidt, 2019
Homaloderodes Jeannel, 1962
Huoyanodytes Tian & Huang, 2016
Iberotrechus Jeannel, 1920
Iga Ueno, 1953
Incatrechus Mateu & Belles, 1982
Inotrechus Dolzhanski & Ljovushkin, 1989
Ishidatrechus Ueno, 1956
Ishikawatrechus Habu, 1950
Italaphaenops Ghidini, 1964
Iyotrechus Ueno & Naito, 2009
Jalzicaphaenops Lohaj & Lakota, 2010
Jeannelius Kurnakov, 1959
Jiangxiaphaenops Ueno & Clarke, 2007
Jiulongotrechus Tian; Huang & Wang, 2015
Junaphaenops Ueno, 1997
Junnanotrechus Ueno & Yin, 1993
Kettlotrechus Townsend, 2010
Kosswigia Jeannel, 1947
Kozlovites Jeannel, 1935
Kupetrechus Larochelle & Larivière, 2007
Kurasawatrechus Yoshida & Nomura, 1952
Kusumia Ueno, 1952
Lanxangaphaenops Deuve, 2012
Laoblemus Ueno, 2006
Laosaphaenops Deuve, 2000
Lessinodytes Vigna Taglianti, 1982
Libotrechus Ueno, 1998
Luoxiaotrechus Tian & Yin, 2013
Luyatrechus M.Etonti & Mateu, 2000
Luzonotrechus Ueno, 1979
Mamesdytes Trezzi, 2003
Masuzoa Ueno, 1960
Masuzonoblemus Ueno, 1989
Mayaphaenops Vigna Taglianti, 1977
Meganophthalmus Kurnakov, 1959
Mexaphaenops Bolivar y Pieltain, 1942
Mexitrechus Barr, 1982
Miaotrechus Tian; Chen & Ma, 2020
Microblemus Ueno, 2007
Mimanillus B.Moore, 1972
Mimotrechus B.Moore, 1972
Minimaphaenops Deuve, 2000
Minosaphaenops Queinnec, 2008
Minutotrechus Deuve & Kavanaugh, 2016
Nannotrechus Winkler, 1926
Nanotrechiama Belousov & Kabak, 2018
Neaphaenops Jeannel, 1920
Nelsonites Valentine, 1952
Neotrechus G.Müller, 1913
Nesaeoduvalius Casale & Giachino, 2016
Nesiotrechus Ueno, 1995
Nipponaphaenops Ueno, 1971
Nototrechus B.Moore, 1972
Nunbergites Pawlowski & Stachowiak, 1991
Omalodera Blanchard, 1842
Oodinotrechus Ueno, 1998
Oroblemites Ueno & Pawlowski, 1981
Oroblemus Ueno & Yoshida, 1966
Orotrechus G.Müller, 1913
Oxytrechus Jeannel, 1927
Panaphaenops Tian; Huang & Ma, 2021
Paracimmerites Belousov, 1998
Paraphaenops Jeannel, 1916
Paratrechiotes Ueno, 1995
Paratrechus Jeannel, 1920
Petraphaenops Delic; Kapla & Colla, 2019
Pheggomisetes Knirsch, 1923
Pilosaphaenops Deuve & Tian, 2008
Plesioaphaenops Deuve & Tian, 2011
Pogonoschema Jeannel, 1927
Pontodytes Casale & Giachino, 1989
Porocimmerites Belousov, 1998
Protrechiama Belousov & Kabak, 2003
Pseudanophthalmus Jeannel, 1920
Pseudaphaenops Winkler, 1912
Pseudocnides Jeannel, 1927
Pseudotrechisibus Mateu & Belles, 1982
Puertrechus Belousov & Kabak, 2014
Putzeysius Jeannel, 1962
Qianaphaenops Ueno, 2000
Qianotrechus Ueno, 2000
Queinnectrechus Deuve, 1992
Rakantrechus Ueno, 1951
Ryugadous Habu, 1950
Sardaphaenops Cerruti & Henrot, 1956
Satotrechus Ueno, 2006
Sbordoniella Vigna Taglianti, 1980
Scotoplanetes Absolon, 1913
Scototrechus Britton, 1962
Shenaphaenops Ueno, 1999
Shennongotrechus Ueno, 2004
Shenoblemus Tian & Fang, 2020
Shilinotrechus Ueno, 2003
Shiqianaphaenops Tian, 2016
Shuangheaphaenops Tian, 2017
Shuaphaenops Ueno, 1999
Sichuanotrechus Deuve, 2005
Sidublemus Tian & Yin, 2013
Sinaphaenops Ueno & Wang, 1991
Sinocimmerites Deuve, 2007
Sinotrechiama Ueno, 2000
Sinotroglodytes Deuve, 1996
Sloanella Jeannel, 1927
Speotrechus Jeannel, 1922
Stevensius Jeannel, 1923
Stygiotrechus Ueno, 1958
Subilsia Español, 1967
Sumatrechus Deuve, 2005
Superbotrechus Deuve & Tian, 2009
Suzuka Ueno, 1956
Taiwanotrechus Ueno, 1987
Taniatrechus Belousov & Dolzhanski, 1994
Tasmanorites Jeannel, 1927
Tasmanotrechus B.Moore, 1972
Taurocimmerites Belousov, 1998
Thalassoduvalius Ueno, 1956
Tianeotrechus Tian & Tang, 2016
Tianzhuaphaenops Zhao & Tian, 2016
Tienmutrechus Suenson, 1957
Tonkinaphaenops Deuve, 2013
Toshiaphaenops Ueno, 1999
Trechepaphiama Deuve & Kavanaugh, 2016
Trechepaphiopsis Deuve & Kavanaugh, 2016
Trechiama Jeannel, 1927
Trechiamiotes Deuve, 1998
Trechicomimus Mateu & Nègre, 1972
Trechiella Jeannel, 1927
Trechimorphus Jeannel, 1927
Trechinotus Jeannel, 1962
Trechiotes Jeannel, 1954
Trechisibus Motschulsky, 1862
Trechistus B.Moore, 1972
Trechoblemus Ganglbauer, 1891
Trechus Clairville, 1806
Trichaphaenops Jeannel, 1916
Troglocimmerites Ljovuschkin, 1970
Tropidotrechus Jeannel, 1927
Typhlotrechus G.Müller, 1913
Uenoaphaenops Tian & He, 2020
Uenoites Belousov & Kabak, 2016
Uenotrechus Deuve & Tian, 1999
Ushijimaella Ueno, 1980
Velebitaphaenops Casale & Jalzic, 2012
Velesaphaenops S.Curcic et al., 2018
Vietotrechus Ueno, 1995
Wanhuaphaenops Tian & Wang, 2016
Wanoblemus Tian & Fang, 2016
Wulongoblemus Ueno, 2007
Xenotrechus Barr & Krekeler, 1967
Xiangxius Tian; Huang & Li, 2021
Xuedytes Tian & Huang, 2017
Yalongaphaenops Belousov & Kabak, 2021
Yamautidius Ueno, 1957
Yanzaphaenops Ueno, 2010
Yunotrechus Tian & Huang, 2014
Zhijinaphaenops Ueno & Ran, 2002

Subtribe Trechodina Jeannel, 1926

Amblystogenium Enderlein, 1905
Canarobius Machado, 1987
Cnides Motschulsky, 1862
Cothresia Jeannel, 1964
Cyphotrechodes Jeannel, 1926
Eotrechodes Ueno; Lafer & Sundukov, 1995
Himalotrechodes Ueno, 1981
Iberotrechodes Faille et al., 2021
Pachydesus Motschulsky, 1864
Pachytrechodes Jeannel, 1960
Paratrechodes Jeannel, 1926
Scaurotrechodes Geginat, 2006
Spelaeovulcania Machado, 1987
Sporades Fauvel, 1882
Thalassophilus Wollaston, 1854
Trechobembix Jeannel, 1926
Trechodes Blackburn, 1901
Trechosia Jeannel, 1926
Trechosiella Jeannel, 1960

†Antarctotrechus Ashworth & Erwin, 2016
†Trechinites Heer, 1862
†Trechoides Motschulsky, 1856

Tribe Zolini Sharp, 1886

Subtribe Merizodontina Sloane, 1920

Idacarabus Lea, 1910
Maungazolus Larochelle & Larivière, 2017
Merizodus Solier, 1849
Percodermus Sloane, 1920
Pseudoopterus Csiki, 1928
Pterocyrtus Sloane, 1920
Sloaneana Csiki, 1933
Synteratus Broun, 1909
Thayerella Baehr, 2016

Subtribe Zolina Sharp, 1886

Oopterus Guérin-Méneville, 1841
Zolus Sharp, 1886

=== Subfamily Xenaroswellianinae Erwin, 2007 ===
Xenaroswelliana Erwin, 2007

=== Subfamily †Conjunctiinae Ponomarenko, 1977 ===
†Conjunctia Ponomarenko, 1977

=== Subfamily †Protorabinae Ponomarenko, 1977 ===
†Aethocarabus Ren; Lu & Guo, 1995
†Atrirabus Hong & Wang, 1990
†Cordorabus Ponomarenko, 1977
†Cretorabus Ponomarenko, 1977
†Denudirabus Ren; Lu & Guo, 1995
†Lirabus Hong, 1992
†Lithorabus Ponomarenko, 1977
†Magnirabus Hong & Wang, 1990
†Mesorabus Ponomarenko, 1977
†Nebrorabus Ponomarenko, 1989
†Ovrabites Ponomarenko, 1977
†Penecupes Ren, 1995
†Protorabus Ponomarenko, 1977
†Tica Hong, 1992
Not Assigned to Subfamily
†Agatoides Motschulsky, 1856
†Amphoxyne Bode, 1953
†Carabites Heer, 1852
†Cavicarabus Hong, 1991
†Conexicoxa Lin, 1986
†Cymatopterus Lomnicki, 1894
†Fangshania Hong, 1981
†Glenopterus Heer, 1847
†Hebeicarabus Hong, 1983
†Megacarabus Hong, 1983
†Meileyingia Hong, 1987
†Miocarabus Hong, 1983
†Neothanes Scudder, 1890
†Procarabus Oppenheim, 1888
†Prosynactus Bode, 1953
†Shanwangicarabus Hong, 1985
†Sinis Heer, 1862
†Sinocalosoma Hong & Wang, 1986
†Sinocaralosoma Hong, 1984
†Sunocarabus Hong, 1987
†Tauredon Handlirsch, 1910
†Wuchangicarabus Hong, 1991
†Xishanocarabus Hong, 1984
†Yunnanocarabus Lin, 1977
