= Aphaenopidius =

Scientific classification
- Kingdom: Animalia
- Phylum: Arthropoda
- Class: Insecta
- Order: Coleoptera
- Suborder: Adephaga
- Family: Carabidae
- Subfamily: Trechinae
- Genus: Aphaenopidius; J. Muhler, 1913

Species
- See text

Genus of beetles

Aphaenopidius is a genus of beetles in the family Carabidae.

== Species ==
The genus includes the following species:

- Aphaenopidius kamnikensis Drovenik, 1987
- Aphaenopidius treulandi J. Muller, 1909
