= Trechiotes =

Scientific classification
- Kingdom: Animalia
- Phylum: Arthropoda
- Class: Insecta
- Order: Coleoptera
- Suborder: Adephaga
- Family: Carabidae
- Subfamily: Trechinae
- Genus: Trechiotes; Jeannel, 1954

Genus of beetles

Trechiotes is a genus of beetles in the family Carabidae, containing the following species:

- Trechiotes luticola Ueno, 1995 (Vietnam)
- Trechiotes perroti (Jeannel, 1954) (China and Vietnam)
- Trechiotes tonkinicus Deuve, 2005 (Vietnam)
