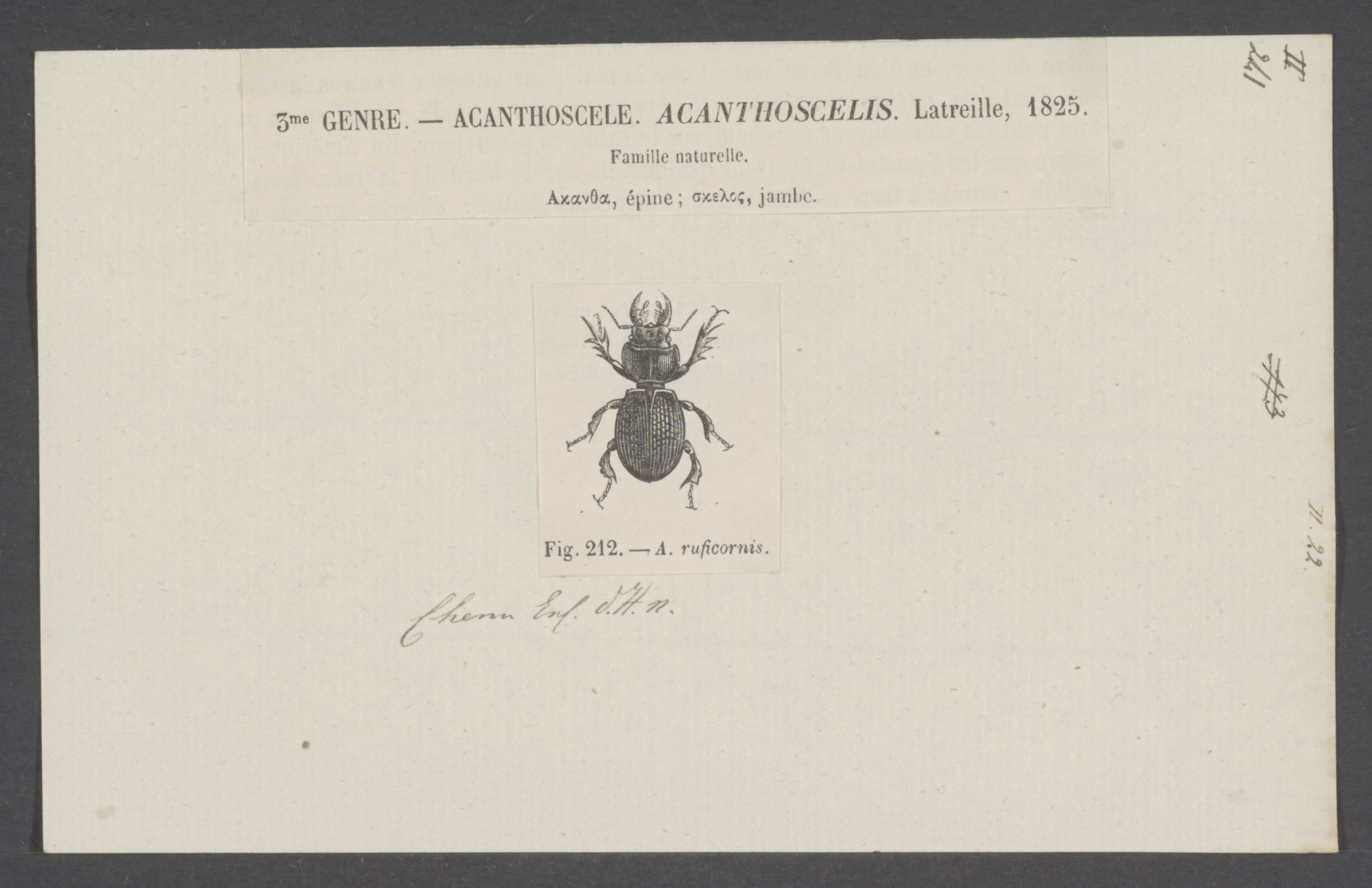

Conservation status
- Endangered (IUCN 3.1)

Scientific classification
- Kingdom: Animalia
- Phylum: Arthropoda
- Class: Insecta
- Order: Coleoptera
- Suborder: Adephaga
- Family: Carabidae
- Subfamily: Scaritinae
- Genus: Acanthoscelis; Dejean, 1825
- Species: A. ruficornis

Binomial name
- Acanthoscelis ruficornis (Fabricius, 1801)

= Acanthoscelis =

Genus of beetles

Acanthoscelis ruficornis, the beach ground beetle, is a species of ground beetle in the Scaritinae subfamily, the only species in the genus Acanthoscelis.

== Description ==
A. ruficornis is 18 millimetres (0.71 in) long and have black coloured legs and reddish tarsi. Its head and thorax are wrinkled while its antennae is of the same colour as its tarsi. It also have front tibia which is broad and flattened.

== Ecology ==
When it comes to feeding, A. ruficornis is a night predator. During that time he feeds on various species of Isopoda and Amphipoda as well as both adult and larva insects. It inhabits beaches where there is plenty of sand and hides under seaweeds.

== Distribution ==
A. ruficornis are found in Namibia and South Africa, on the coast.
