= Celanida =

Scientific classification
- Domain: Eukaryota
- Kingdom: Animalia
- Phylum: Arthropoda
- Class: Insecta
- Order: Coleoptera
- Suborder: Adephaga
- Family: Carabidae
- Tribe: Moriomorphini
- Subtribe: Moriomorphina
- Genus: Celanida; Laporte, 1867
- Species: C. montana

Binomial name
- Celanida montana Laporte, 1867

Synonyms
- Celandia Csiki, 1929

Genus of beetles

Celanida is a genus in the ground beetle family Carabidae. This genus has a single species, Celanida montana. It is found in Australia.
