= Tienmutrechus =

Tienmutrechus dispersipunctis

Scientific classification
- Kingdom: Animalia
- Phylum: Arthropoda
- Class: Insecta
- Order: Coleoptera
- Suborder: Adephaga
- Family: Carabidae
- Subfamily: Trechinae
- Genus: Tienmutrechus; Suenson, 1957
- Species: T. dispersipunctis

Binomial name
- Tienmutrechus dispersipunctis Suenson, 1957

Genus of beetles

Tienmutrechus dispersipunctis is a species of beetle in the family Carabidae, the only species in the genus Tienmutrechus. It is found in China.
