= Putzeysius =

Scientific classification
- Kingdom: Animalia
- Phylum: Arthropoda
- Class: Insecta
- Order: Coleoptera
- Suborder: Adephaga
- Family: Carabidae
- Subfamily: Trechinae
- Genus: Putzeysius; Jeannel, 1962

Genus of beetles

Putzeysius is a genus of beetles in the family Carabidae, containing the following species:

- Putzeysius coecus Sciaky & Grottolo, 1996
- Putzeysius quadriceps (Putzeys, 1870)
