= Hemitelestus =

Scientific classification
- Kingdom: Animalia
- Phylum: Arthropoda
- Class: Insecta
- Order: Coleoptera
- Suborder: Adephaga
- Family: Carabidae
- Subfamily: Pterostichinae
- Tribe: Cratocerini
- Subtribe: Drimostomatina
- Genus: Hemitelestus; Alluaud, 1895

Synonyms
- Hemiteles Brullé, 1837

Genus of beetles

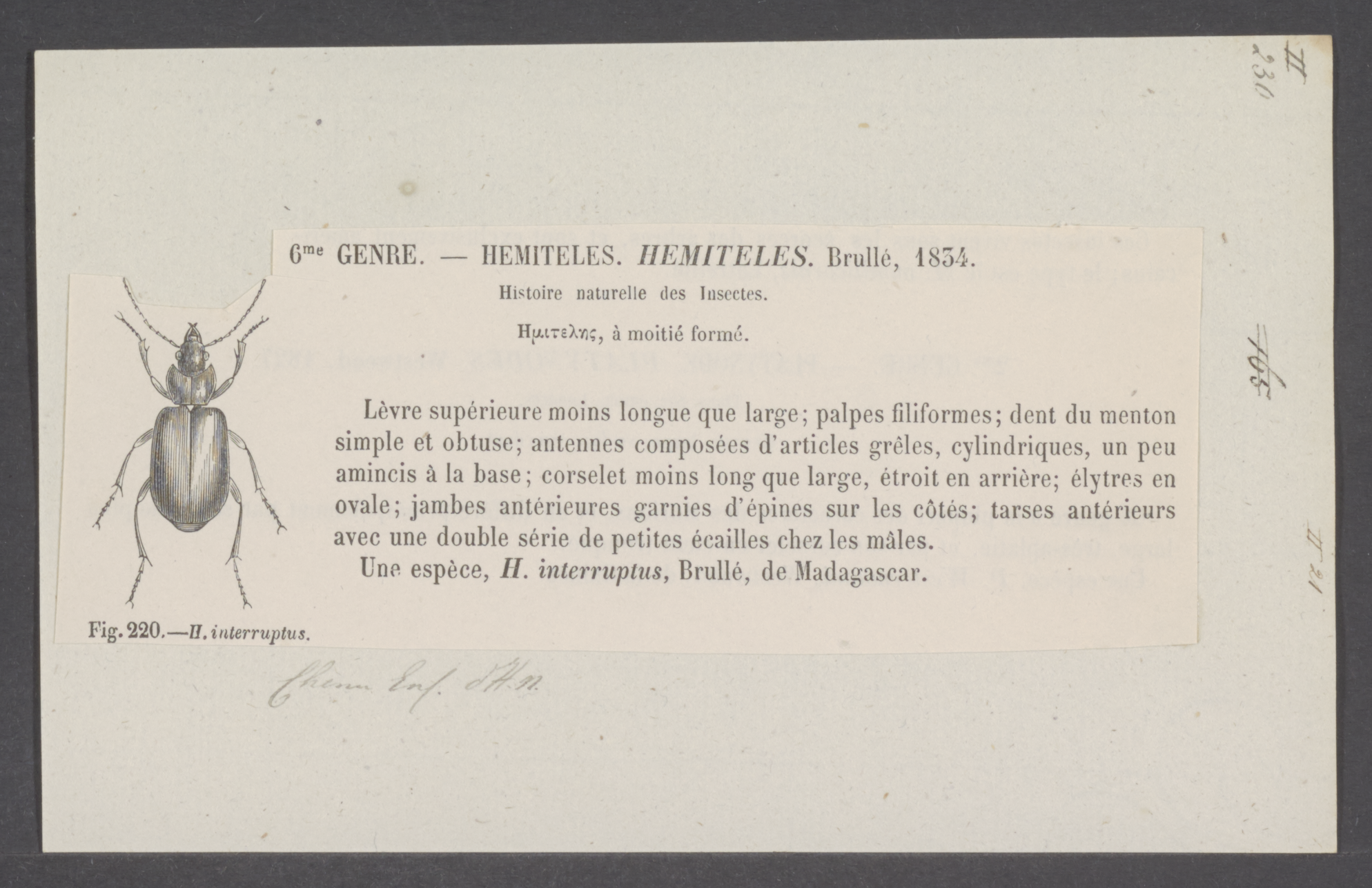
Hemitelestus interruptus in Iconographia Zoologica

Hemitelestus is a genus of carabids in the beetle family Carabidae. There are at least two described species in Hemitelestus, found in Madagascar.

== Species ==
These two species belong to the genus Hemitelestus:

- Hemitelestus hova Alluaud, 1897
- Hemitelestus interruptus (Brullé, 1837)
