= Trechinotus =

Scientific classification
- Domain: Eukaryota
- Kingdom: Animalia
- Phylum: Arthropoda
- Class: Insecta
- Order: Coleoptera
- Suborder: Adephaga
- Family: Carabidae
- Subfamily: Trechinae
- Genus: Trechinotus; Jeannel, 1962

Extant species
- See text

Genus of beetles

Trechinotus is a genus of beetles in the family Carabidae, containing the following species. They are found in Chile.

- Trechinotus flavocinctus Jeannel, 1962
- Trechinotus flavolimbatus Jeannel, 1962
- Trechinotus striatulus Mateu & Negre, 1972
