= Trechiella =

Scientific classification
- Kingdom: Animalia
- Phylum: Arthropoda
- Class: Insecta
- Order: Coleoptera
- Suborder: Adephaga
- Family: Carabidae
- Subfamily: Trechinae
- Genus: Trechiella; Jeannel, 1927

Genus of beetles

Trechiella is a genus of beetles in the family Carabidae, containing the following species. They are found in Australia.

- Trechiella queenslandica Moore, 1972
- Trechiella subornatella (Blackburn, 1901)
