= Diachipteryx =

Scientific classification
- Domain: Eukaryota
- Kingdom: Animalia
- Phylum: Arthropoda
- Class: Insecta
- Order: Coleoptera
- Suborder: Adephaga
- Family: Carabidae
- Subfamily: Pterostichinae
- Tribe: Cratocerini
- Subtribe: Drimostomatina
- Genus: Diachipteryx; Alluaud, 1925
- Species: D. paradoxa

Binomial name
- Diachipteryx paradoxa Alluaud, 1925

Genus of beetles

Diachipteryx is a genus in the ground beetle family Carabidae. This genus has a single species, Diachipteryx paradoxa. It is known from the African countries Guinea, Sierra Leone, Ivory Coast, Cameroon, Equatorial Guinea, and the Democratic Republic of the Congo.
