= Prodyscherodes =

Scientific classification
- Domain: Eukaryota
- Kingdom: Animalia
- Phylum: Arthropoda
- Class: Insecta
- Order: Coleoptera
- Suborder: Adephaga
- Family: Carabidae
- Tribe: Scaritini
- Subtribe: Scaritina
- Genus: Prodyscherodes; Jeannel, 1955
- Species: P. pauliani

Binomial name
- Prodyscherodes pauliani Jeannel, 1955

Genus of beetles

Prodyscherodes is a genus in the ground beetle family Carabidae. This genus has a single species, Prodyscherodes pauliani. It is found in Madagascar.
