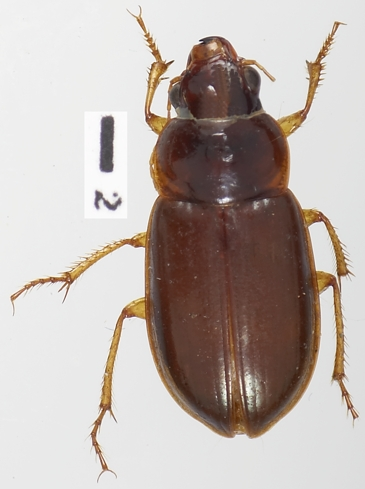
- Antarctiola laevigata

Scientific classification
- Kingdom: Animalia
- Phylum: Arthropoda
- Class: Insecta
- Order: Coleoptera
- Suborder: Adephaga
- Family: Carabidae
- Subfamily: Pterostichinae
- Genus: Antarctiola; Straneo, 1977

= Antarctiola =

Genus of beetles

Antarctiola is a genus of beetles in the family Carabidae, containing the following species:

- Antarctiola amaroides (Motschulsky, 1866)
- Antarctiola laevigata (Putzeys, 1875)
- Antarctiola laevis Straneo, 1951
- Antarctiola motschulskyi (Csiki, 1931)
