= Awatrechus =

Scientific classification
- Kingdom: Animalia
- Phylum: Arthropoda
- Class: Insecta
- Order: Coleoptera
- Suborder: Adephaga
- Family: Carabidae
- Subfamily: Trechinae
- Genus: Awatrechus; Ueno, 1955

Genus of beetles

Awatrechus is a genus of beetles in the family Carabidae, containing the following species:

- Awatrechus bisetiger Ueno, 1973
- Awatrechus hygrobius Ueno, 1955
- Awatrechus misatonis Ueno, 2003
- Awatrechus occidentalis Ueno, 2003
- Awatrechus oligotrichus Ueno, 2003
- Awatrechus persimilis Ueno, 1969
- Awatrechus pilosus Ueno, 1957
- Awatrechus religiosus Ueno, 1957
- Awatrechus sancticareae Ueno, 2003
- Awatrechus simplicior Ueno, 2003
- Awatrechus yoshidai Ueno, 1969
