= Corintascaris =

Scientific classification
- Domain: Eukaryota
- Kingdom: Animalia
- Phylum: Arthropoda
- Class: Insecta
- Order: Coleoptera
- Suborder: Adephaga
- Family: Carabidae
- Subfamily: Scaritinae
- Tribe: Corintascarini
- Genus: Corintascaris; Basilewsky, 1952
- Species: C. ferreirae

Binomial name
- Corintascaris ferreirae Basilewsky, 1952

Genus of beetles

Corintascaris is a genus in the ground beetle family Carabidae. This genus has a single species, Corintascaris ferreirae. It is found in Malawi, Mozambique, and South Africa.
