= Pachycaecus =

Scientific classification
- Domain: Eukaryota
- Kingdom: Animalia
- Phylum: Arthropoda
- Class: Insecta
- Order: Coleoptera
- Suborder: Adephaga
- Family: Carabidae
- Tribe: Cratocerini
- Subtribe: Drimostomatina
- Genus: Pachycaecus; Straneo, 1971
- Species: P. savanicola

Binomial name
- Pachycaecus savanicola Straneo, 1971

Genus of beetles

Pachycaecus is a genus in the ground beetle family Carabidae. This genus has a single species, Pachycaecus savanicola. It is found in Sierra Leone.
