= Aristochroodes =

Aristochroodes reginae

Scientific classification
- Kingdom: Animalia
- Phylum: Arthropoda
- Class: Insecta
- Order: Coleoptera
- Suborder: Adephaga
- Family: Carabidae
- Subfamily: Pterostichinae
- Genus: Aristochroodes; Marcillac, 1993
- Species: A. reginae

Binomial name
- Aristochroodes reginae Marcillac, 1993

Genus of beetles

Aristochroodes reginae is a species of beetle in the family Carabidae, the only species in the genus Aristochroodes.
