= Crenulostrigus =

Scientific classification
- Kingdom: Animalia
- Phylum: Arthropoda
- Class: Insecta
- Order: Coleoptera
- Suborder: Adephaga
- Family: Carabidae
- Subfamily: Pterostichinae
- Tribe: Cratocerini
- Subtribe: Drimostomatina
- Genus: Crenulostrigus; Straneo, 1942

Genus of beetles

Crenulostrigus is a genus in the ground beetle family Carabidae. There are at least two described species in Crenulostrigus, found in Africa.

== Species ==
These two species belong to the genus Crenulostrigus:

- Crenulostrigus palpalis (Straneo, 1942) (Guinea, Cameroon, Equatorial Guinea, and DR Congo)
- Crenulostrigus profundus (Straneo, 1942) (Gabon)
