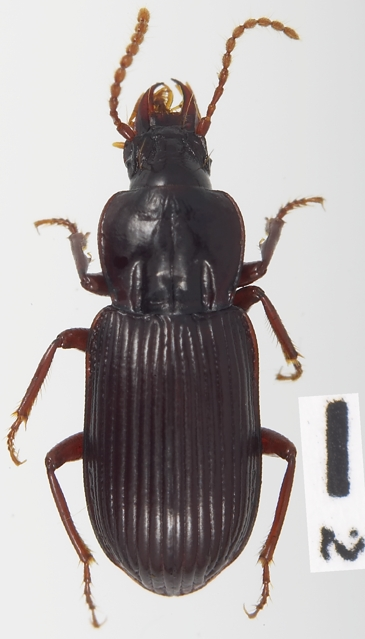
- Caecocaelus elongatus

Scientific classification
- Kingdom: Animalia
- Phylum: Arthropoda
- Class: Insecta
- Order: Coleoptera
- Suborder: Adephaga
- Family: Carabidae
- Subfamily: Pterostichinae
- Genus: Caecocaelus; Straneo, 1949

= Caecocaelus =

Genus of beetles

Caecocaelus is a genus of beetles in the family Carabidae, containing the following species:

- Caecocaelus basilewskyi Straneo, 1949
- Caecocaelus clarkei Straneo, 1979
- Caecocaelus decellei Straneo, 1955
- Caecocaelus elongatus Straneo, 1952
- Caecocaelus kabarensis Straneo, 1956
- Caecocaelus leleupi Straneo, 1951
- Caecocaelus microphthalmus (Jeannel, 1948)
- Caecocaelus ruandanus Straneo, 1952
- Caecocaelus scotti Straneo, 1953
