= Tropidotrechus =

Scientific classification
- Kingdom: Animalia
- Phylum: Arthropoda
- Class: Insecta
- Order: Coleoptera
- Suborder: Adephaga
- Family: Carabidae
- Subfamily: Trechinae
- Genus: Tropidotrechus; Jeannel, 1927

Genus of beetles

Tropidotrechus is a genus of beetles in the family Carabidae, containing the following species:

- Tropidotrechus bawbawensis Moore, 1972
- Tropidotrechus microps Moore, 1972
- Tropidotrechus vicinus Moore, 1972
- Tropidotrechus victoriae (Blackburn, 1894)
