= Omalodera =

Omalodera dentimaculata

Scientific classification
- Kingdom: Animalia
- Phylum: Arthropoda
- Clade: Pancrustacea
- Class: Insecta
- Order: Coleoptera
- Suborder: Adephaga
- Family: Carabidae
- Subfamily: Trechinae
- Genus: Omalodera; Solier, 1879
- Species: O. dentimaculata

Binomial name
- Omalodera dentimaculata Solier, 1879

Genus of beetles

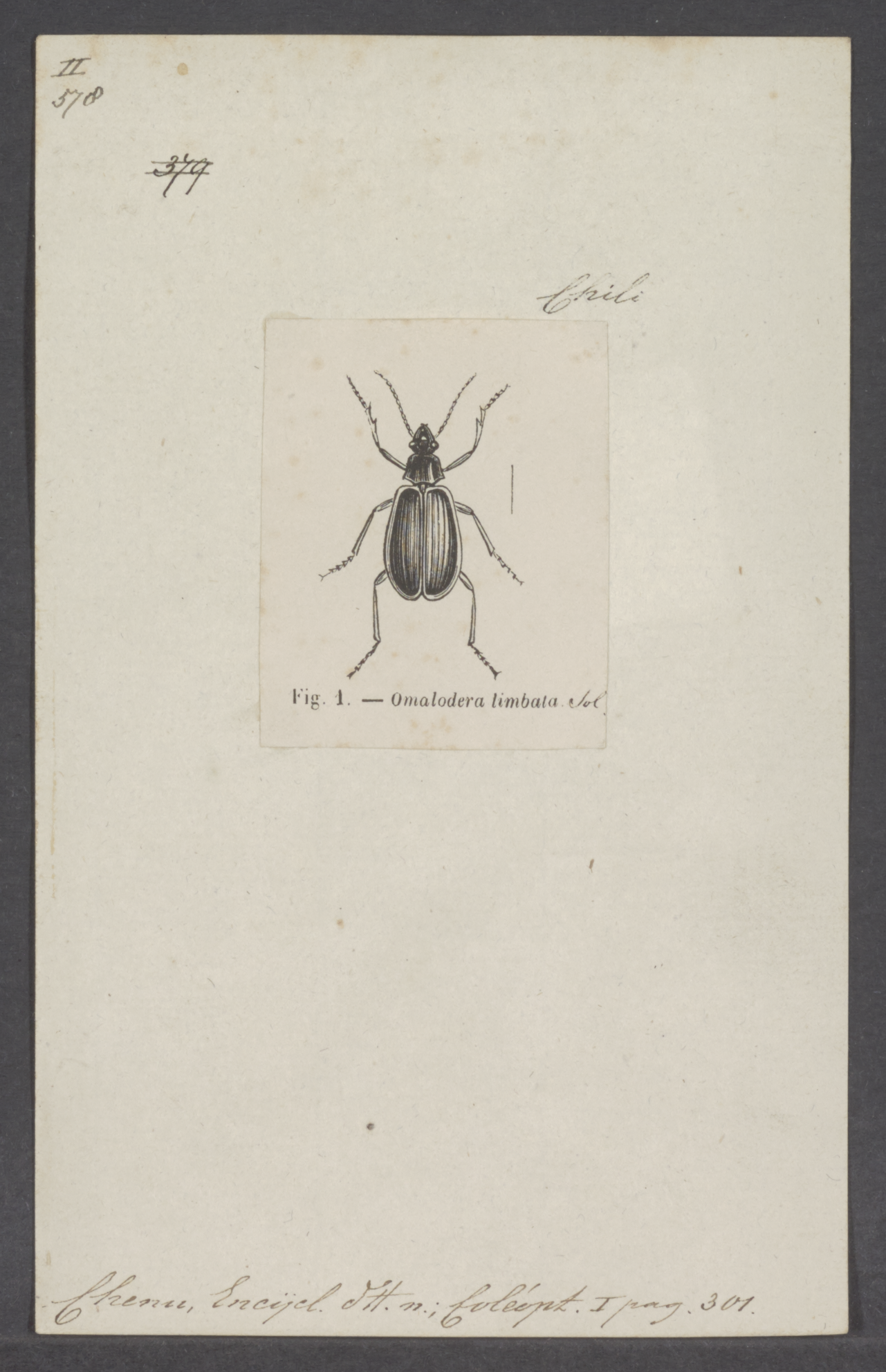
Zoological illustration of Omalodera from the Iconographia Zoologica collection

Omalodera dentimaculata is a species of beetle in the family Carabidae, the only species in the genus Omalodera.
