= Platyxythrius =

Scientific classification
- Domain: Eukaryota
- Kingdom: Animalia
- Phylum: Arthropoda
- Class: Insecta
- Order: Coleoptera
- Suborder: Adephaga
- Family: Carabidae
- Subfamily: Pterostichinae
- Tribe: Cratocerini
- Subtribe: Drimostomatina
- Genus: Platyxythrius; Lorenz, 1998

Genus of beetles

Platyxythrius is a genus in the ground beetle family Carabidae. There are at least 20 described species in Platyxythrius, found in Africa.

== Species ==
These 20 species belong to the genus Platyxythrius:

- Platyxythrius bertrandi (Straneo, 1951) (Cameroon, Equatorial Guinea, Gabon, DR Congo)
- Platyxythrius cavicola (Straneo in Basilewsky & Straneo, 1950) (DR Congo)
- Platyxythrius clarkei Straneo, 1979 (Ethiopia)
- Platyxythrius contractus (Straneo, 1941) (Guinea, Cameroon, Equatorial Guinea)
- Platyxythrius gigas (Straneo, 1952) (DR Congo and Rwanda)
- Platyxythrius insularis Straneo, 1956 (Sao Tome)
- Platyxythrius jeanneli (Straneo, 1942) (Tanzania)
- Platyxythrius laevicollis (Burgeon, 1935) (Guinea, Cameroon, DR Congo, Rwanda)
- Platyxythrius latiusculus (Straneo, 1952) (Kenya)
- Platyxythrius luluanus (Straneo, 1939) (Guinea, Ivory Coast, Ghana, Cameroon, DR Congo, Rwanda)
- Platyxythrius major (Straneo, 1941) (Zimbabwe)
- Platyxythrius marginalis Straneo, 1956 (DR Congo, Uganda, Kenya, Rwanda, Tanzania)
- Platyxythrius parumpunctatus (Straneo, 1941) (Cameroon, Congo, DR Congo, Uganda, Kenya, Rwanda, Burundi)
- Platyxythrius pradieri (Chaudoir, 1873) (Togo, Cameroon, Equatorial Guinea, Gabon, DR, Angola)
- Platyxythrius robustus (Straneo, 1941) (Equatorial Guinea)
- Platyxythrius sinuaticollis (Straneo, 1952) (Cameroon, DR Congo, Uganda, Kenya, Rwanda)
- Platyxythrius subrobustus (Straneo, 1952) (Guinea)
- Platyxythrius usambarensis (Straneo, 1942) (Tanzania)
- Platyxythrius vanmoli (Straneo, 1951) (DR Congo)
- Platyxythrius westermanni (Chaudoir, 1873) (Guinea, Liberia, Ivory Coast, Togo, Cameroon, DR Congo)
