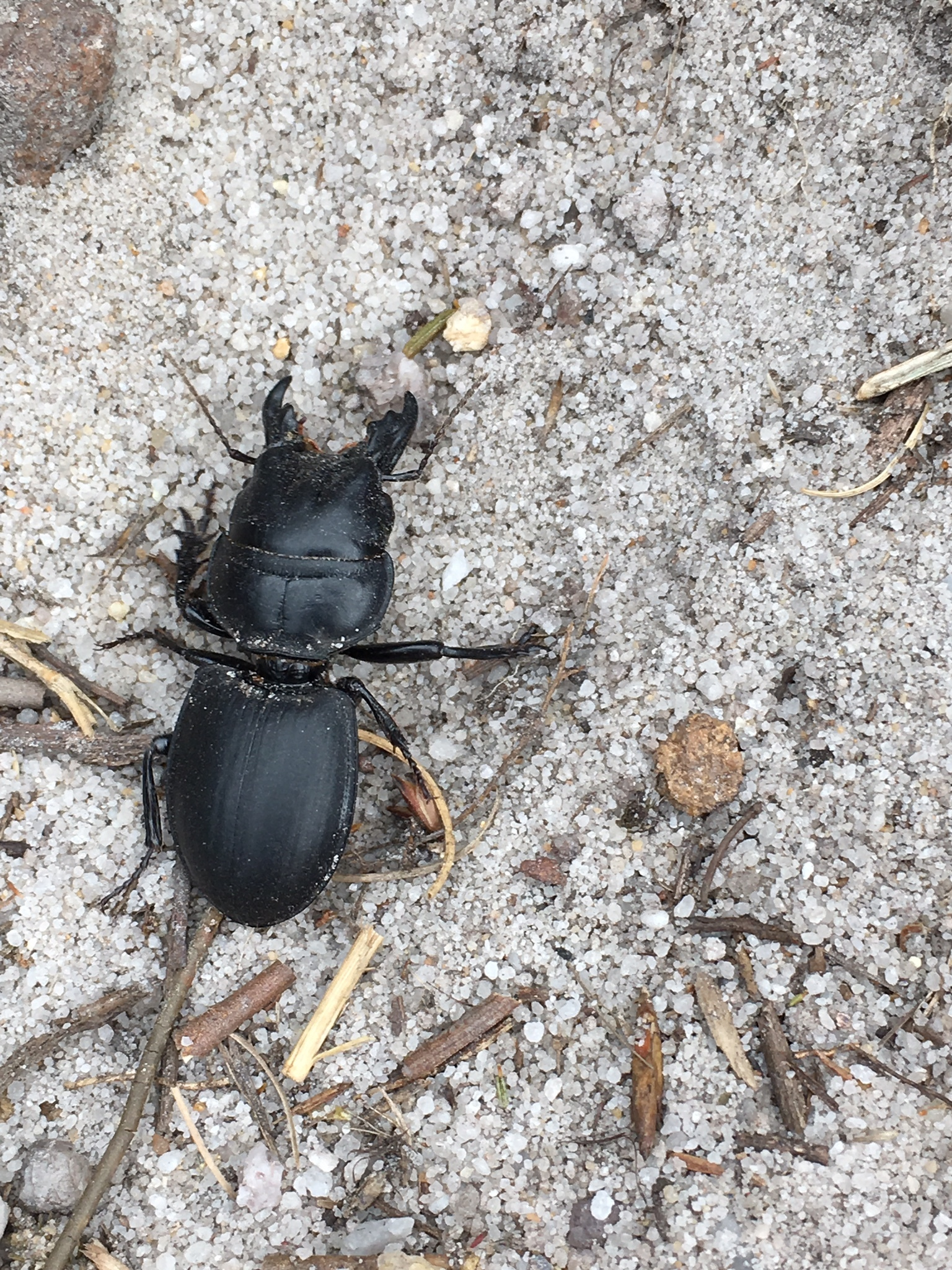
- Pachyodontus languidus, South Africa

Scientific classification
- Domain: Eukaryota
- Kingdom: Animalia
- Phylum: Arthropoda
- Class: Insecta
- Order: Coleoptera
- Suborder: Adephaga
- Family: Carabidae
- Tribe: Scaritini
- Subtribe: Scaritina
- Genus: Pachyodontus; Chaudoir, 1879
- Species: P. languidus

Binomial name
- Pachyodontus languidus (Wiedemann, 1823)

= Pachyodontus =

Genus of beetles

Pachyodontus is a genus in the ground beetle family Carabidae. This genus has a single species, Pachyodontus languidus. It is found in Namibia and South Africa.

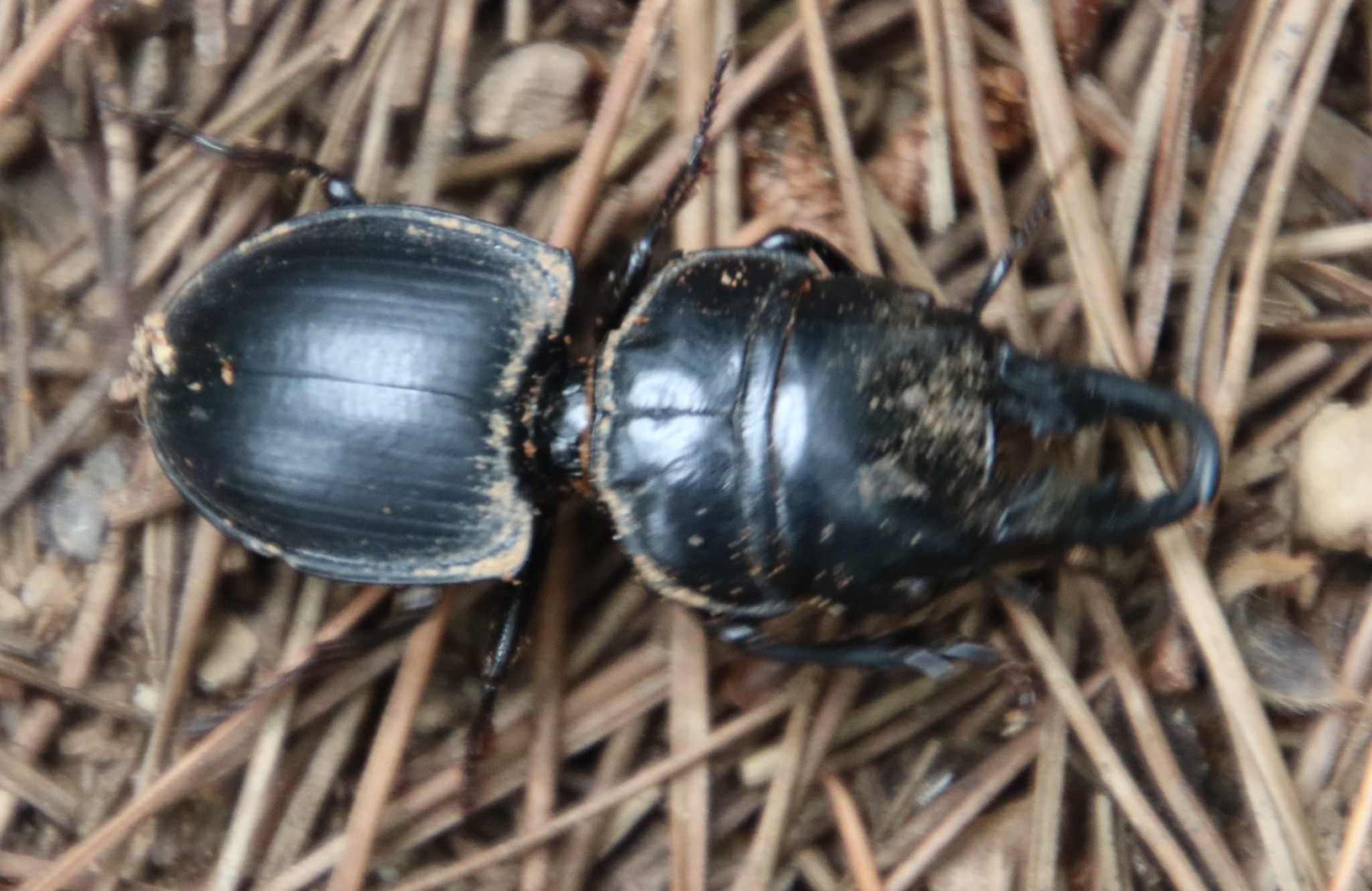
Pachyodontus languidus, South Africa
