= Wahlbergiana =

Scientific classification
- Kingdom: Animalia
- Phylum: Arthropoda
- Class: Insecta
- Order: Coleoptera
- Suborder: Adephaga
- Family: Carabidae
- Subfamily: Pterostichinae
- Genus: Wahlbergiana; Bousquet, 2002

Genus of beetles

Wahlbergiana is a genus of beetles in the family Carabidae, containing the following species:

- Wahlbergiana alternans (Straneo, 1951)
- Wahlbergiana inordinata (Peringuey, 1899)
- Wahlbergiana subaequalis (Straneo, 1965)
- Wahlbergiana undulatorugosa (Tschitscherine, 1890)
