= Xenotrechus =

Scientific classification
- Kingdom: Animalia
- Phylum: Arthropoda
- Class: Insecta
- Order: Coleoptera
- Suborder: Adephaga
- Family: Carabidae
- Subfamily: Trechinae
- Genus: Xenotrechus; Barr & Krekeler, 1967

Genus of beetles

Xenotrechus is a genus of beetles in the family Carabidae, containing the following species:

- Xenotrechus condei Barr & Krekeler, 1967
- Xenotrechus denticollis Barr & Krekeler, 1967
