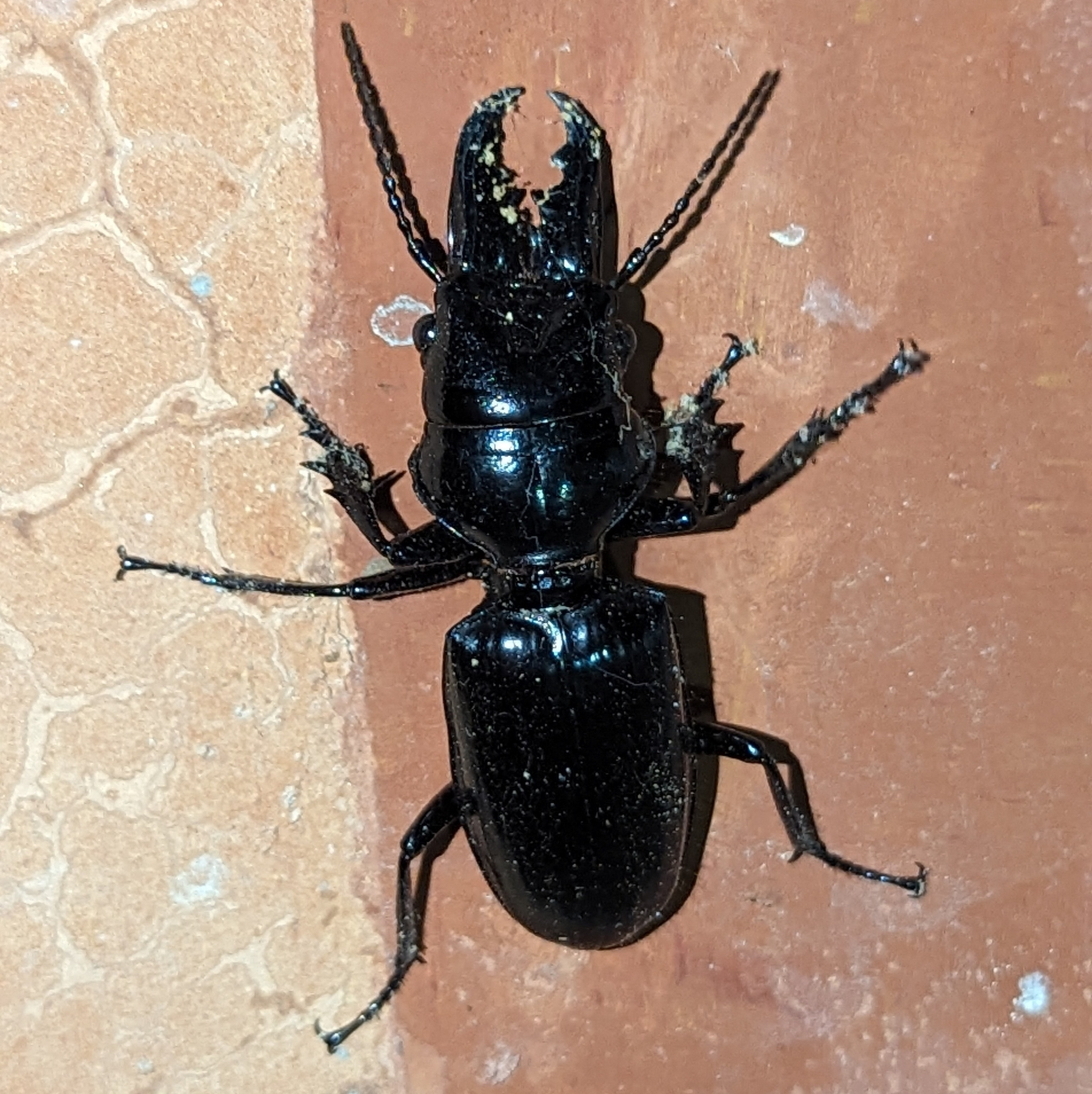
- Ochyropus gigas, Ghana

Scientific classification
- Domain: Eukaryota
- Kingdom: Animalia
- Phylum: Arthropoda
- Class: Insecta
- Order: Coleoptera
- Suborder: Adephaga
- Family: Carabidae
- Tribe: Scaritini
- Subtribe: Scaritina
- Genus: Ochyropus; Schiödte, 1847
- Species: O. gigas

Binomial name
- Ochyropus gigas Schiödte, 1847

Synonyms
- Ochryopus

= Ochyropus =

Genus of beetles

Ochyropus is a genus in the ground beetle family Carabidae. This genus has a single species, Ochyropus gigas. It is found in Africa.
