= Tinognathus =

Scientific classification
- Domain: Eukaryota
- Kingdom: Animalia
- Phylum: Arthropoda
- Class: Insecta
- Order: Coleoptera
- Suborder: Adephaga
- Family: Carabidae
- Genus: Tinognathus; Chaudoir, 1879
- Species: T. parviceps

Binomial name
- Tinognathus parviceps Chaudoir, 1879

Genus of beetles

Tinognathus parviceps is a species of beetle in the family Carabidae, the only species in the genus Tinognathus. It is found in Australia.
