= Mesarthropterus =

Mesarthropterus wasmanni

Scientific classification
- Kingdom: Animalia
- Phylum: Arthropoda
- Class: Insecta
- Order: Coleoptera
- Suborder: Adephaga
- Family: Carabidae
- Subfamily: Harpalinae
- Genus: Mesarthropterus; Wasmann, 1926
- Species: M. wasmanni

Binomial name
- Mesarthropterus wasmanni (Reichensperger, 1915)

Species of beetle

Mesarthropterus wasmanni is a species of beetle in the family Carabidae, the only species in the genus Mesarthropterus.
