= Chaetapatrobus =

Scientific classification
- Domain: Eukaryota
- Kingdom: Animalia
- Phylum: Arthropoda
- Class: Insecta
- Order: Coleoptera
- Suborder: Adephaga
- Family: Carabidae
- Tribe: Patrobini
- Subtribe: Patrobina
- Genus: Chaetapatrobus; Lafer, 1996
- Species: C. valentinae

Binomial name
- Chaetapatrobus valentinae Lafer, 1996

Genus of beetles

Chaetapatrobus is a genus of ground beetles in the family Carabidae. This genus has a single species, Chaetapatrobus valentinae. It is found in Russia.
