= Dactylinius =

Scientific classification
- Kingdom: Animalia
- Phylum: Arthropoda
- Clade: Pancrustacea
- Class: Insecta
- Order: Coleoptera
- Suborder: Adephaga
- Family: Carabidae
- Subfamily: Pterostichinae
- Tribe: Cratocerini
- Subtribe: Drimostomatina
- Genus: Dactylinius; Straneo, 1941
- Species: D. punctipennis

Binomial name
- Dactylinius punctipennis (Burgeon, 1937)

Genus of beetles

Dactylinius is a genus in the ground beetle family Carabidae. This genus has a single species, Dactylinius punctipennis. It is found in Cameroon and the Democratic Republic of the Congo.
