= Pseudamara =

Pseudamara arenaria

Scientific classification
- Kingdom: Animalia
- Phylum: Arthropoda
- Class: Insecta
- Order: Coleoptera
- Suborder: Adephaga
- Family: Carabidae
- Subfamily: Pterostichinae
- Genus: Pseudamara; Lindroth, 1968
- Species: P. arenaria

Binomial name
- Pseudamara arenaria (LeConte, 1848)

Genus of beetles

Pseudamara arenaria is a species of beetle in the family Carabidae, the only species in the genus Pseudamara.
