= Paradyscherus =

Scientific classification
- Domain: Eukaryota
- Kingdom: Animalia
- Phylum: Arthropoda
- Class: Insecta
- Order: Coleoptera
- Suborder: Adephaga
- Family: Carabidae
- Subfamily: Scaritinae
- Tribe: Scaritini
- Subtribe: Scaritina
- Genus: Paradyscherus; Basilewsky, 1971

Genus of beetles

Paradyscherus is a genus in the ground beetle family Carabidae. There are at least three described species in Paradyscherus, found in Madagascar.

== Species ==
These three species belong to the genus Paradyscherus:

- Paradyscherus blanci Basilewsky, 1971
- Paradyscherus jeanneli Basilewsky, 1973
- Paradyscherus peyrierasi Basilewsky, 1973
