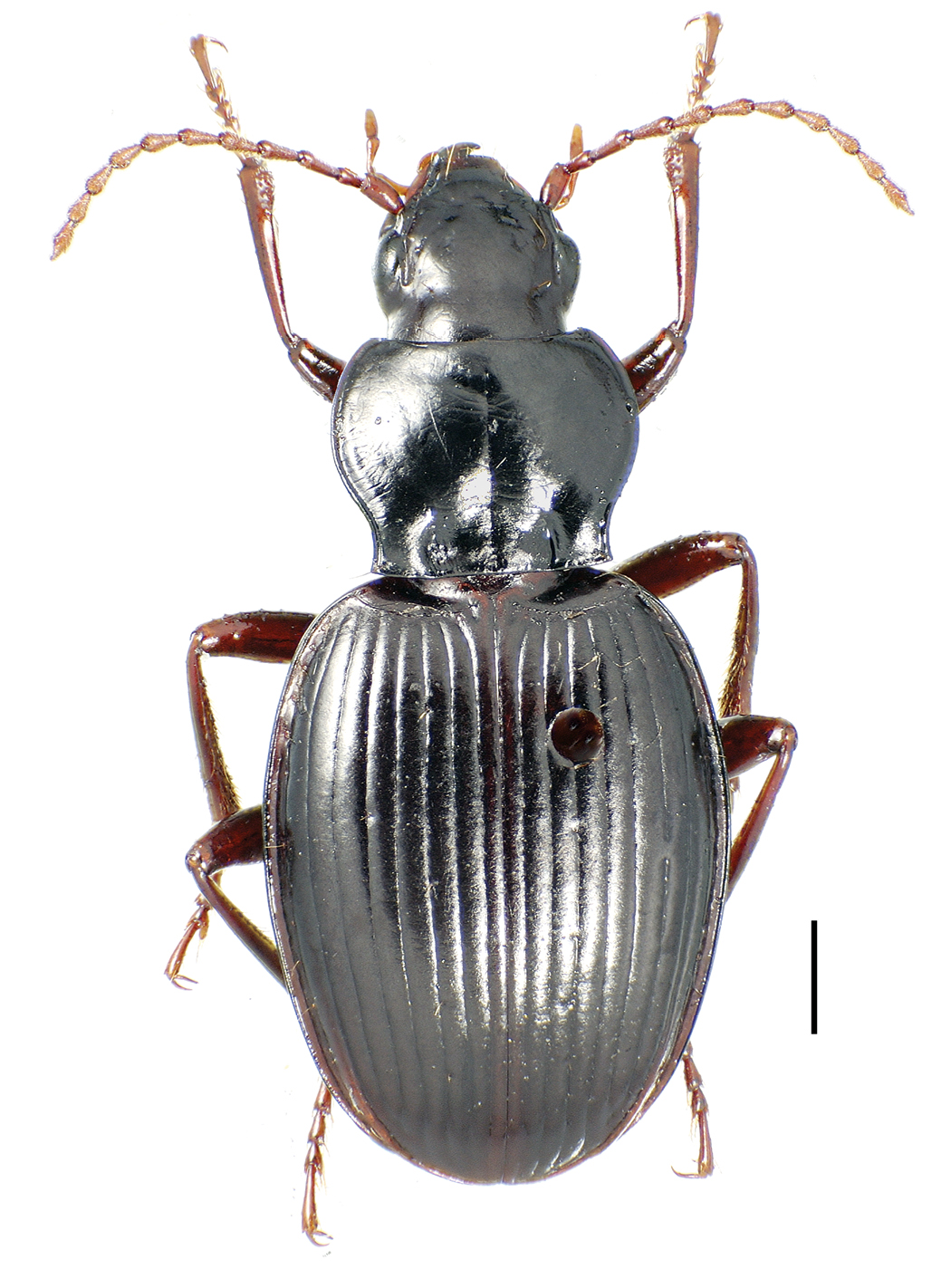
- Rossjoycea glacialis

Scientific classification
- Kingdom: Animalia
- Phylum: Arthropoda
- Class: Insecta
- Order: Coleoptera
- Suborder: Adephaga
- Family: Carabidae
- Tribe: Moriomorphini
- Subtribe: Moriomorphina
- Genus: Rossjoycea; Liebherr, 2011
- Species: R. glacialis

Binomial name
- Rossjoycea glacialis Liebherr, 2011

= Rossjoycea =

Genus of beetles

Rossjoycea is a genus in the ground beetle family Carabidae. This genus has a single species, Rossjoycea glacialis. It is found in New Zealand.
