= Feostoma =

Scientific classification
- Kingdom: Animalia
- Phylum: Arthropoda
- Class: Insecta
- Order: Coleoptera
- Suborder: Adephaga
- Family: Carabidae
- Subfamily: Pterostichinae
- Tribe: Cratocerini
- Subtribe: Drimostomatina
- Genus: Feostoma; Straneo, 1941
- Species: F. irregulare

Binomial name
- Feostoma irregulare Straneo, 1941

Genus of beetles

Feostoma is a genus in the ground beetle family Carabidae. This genus has a single species, Feostoma irregulare. It is found in Equatorial Guinea.
