= Tapinoscaris =

Scientific classification
- Domain: Eukaryota
- Kingdom: Animalia
- Phylum: Arthropoda
- Class: Insecta
- Order: Coleoptera
- Suborder: Adephaga
- Family: Carabidae
- Subfamily: Scaritinae
- Tribe: Scaritini
- Subtribe: Scaritina
- Genus: Tapinoscaris; Jeannel, 1946

Genus of beetles

Tapinoscaris is a genus of in the beetle family Carabidae. There are about 10 described species in Tapinoscaris, found in Madagascar.

== Species ==
These 10 species belong to the genus Tapinoscaris:

- Tapinoscaris carnoti (Alluaud, 1930)
- Tapinoscaris chaudoiri (Harold, 1879)
- Tapinoscaris descarpentriesi Basilewsky, 1971
- Tapinoscaris peyrierasi Basilewsky, 1976
- Tapinoscaris raffrayi (Fairmaire, 1885)
- Tapinoscaris razananae (Alluaud, 1924)
- Tapinoscaris rugatula Jeannel, 1946
- Tapinoscaris rugulicollis (Fairmaire, 1887)
- Tapinoscaris tricostis (Fairmaire, 1869)
- Tapinoscaris variolosa (Alluaud, 1930)
