= Neanops =

Scientific classification
- Kingdom: Animalia
- Phylum: Arthropoda
- Class: Insecta
- Order: Coleoptera
- Suborder: Adephaga
- Family: Carabidae
- Subfamily: Trechinae
- Genus: Neanops; Britton, 1962

Genus of beetles

Neanops is a genus of beetles in the family Carabidae, containing the following species:

- Neanops caecus (Britton, 1960)
- Neanops pritchardi Valentine, 1987
