= Austrotrechus =

Scientific classification
- Kingdom: Animalia
- Phylum: Arthropoda
- Class: Insecta
- Order: Coleoptera
- Suborder: Adephaga
- Family: Carabidae
- Subfamily: Trechinae
- Genus: Austrotrechus; Moore, 1972

Genus of beetles

Austrotrechus is a genus of beetles in the family Carabidae, containing the following species:

- Austrotrechus contortus Moore, 1972
- Austrotrechus kosciuskoanus (Sloane, 1923)
