= Anchotrechus =

Anchotrechus punctipennis

Scientific classification
- Kingdom: Animalia
- Phylum: Arthropoda
- Class: Insecta
- Order: Coleoptera
- Suborder: Adephaga
- Family: Carabidae
- Subfamily: Trechinae
- Genus: Anchotrechus; Jeannel, 1927
- Species: A. punctipennis

Binomial name
- Anchotrechus punctipennis Jeannel, 1927

Genus of beetles

Anchotrechus punctipennis is a species of beetle in the family Carabidae, the only species in the genus Anchotrechus.
