= Aphaenopsis =

Scientific classification
- Kingdom: Animalia
- Phylum: Arthropoda
- Class: Insecta
- Order: Coleoptera
- Suborder: Adephaga
- Family: Carabidae
- Subfamily: Trechinae
- Genus: Aphaenopsis; J. Muller, 1913

Genus of beetles

Aphaenopsis is a genus of beetles in the family Carabidae, containing the following species:

- Aphaenopsis apfelbecki Ganglbauer, 1891
- Aphaenopsis pfeiferi Apfelbeck, 1908
