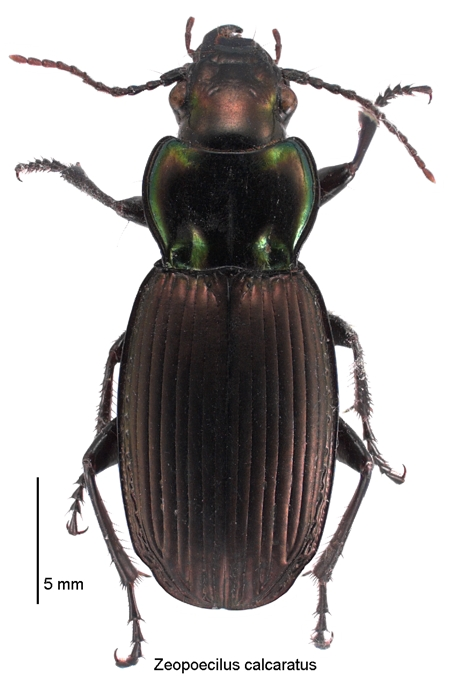
- Zeopoecilus calcaratus

Scientific classification
- Kingdom: Animalia
- Phylum: Arthropoda
- Class: Insecta
- Order: Coleoptera
- Suborder: Adephaga
- Family: Carabidae
- Subfamily: Pterostichinae
- Genus: Zeopoecilus; Sharp, 1886

= Zeopoecilus =

Genus of beetles

Zeopoecilus is a genus of beetles in the family Carabidae, containing the following species:

- Zeopoecilus calcaratus (Sharp 1886)
- Zeopoecilus caperatus Johns, 2007
- Zeopoecilus putus (Broun 1882)
