= Egadyla =

Scientific classification
- Domain: Eukaryota
- Kingdom: Animalia
- Phylum: Arthropoda
- Class: Insecta
- Order: Coleoptera
- Suborder: Adephaga
- Family: Carabidae
- Subfamily: Harpalinae
- Genus: Egadyla; Alluaud, 1916
- Species: E. antelmei

Binomial name
- Egadyla antelmei Alluaud, 1916

Species of beetle

Egadyla antelmei is a species of beetle in the family Carabidae, the only species in the genus Egadyla.
