= Allotrechiama =

Scientific classification
- Kingdom: Animalia
- Phylum: Arthropoda
- Class: Insecta
- Order: Coleoptera
- Suborder: Adephaga
- Family: Carabidae
- Subfamily: Trechinae
- Genus: Allotrechiama; Ueno, 1970

Genus of beetles

Allotrechiama is a species of beetles in the family of Carabidae, containing the following species:

- Allotrechiama dentifer Ueno, 1978
- Allotrechiama iriei Ueno, 1970
- Allotrechiama tenellus Ueno, 1959
- Allotrechiama mandibularis Ueno, 1978
