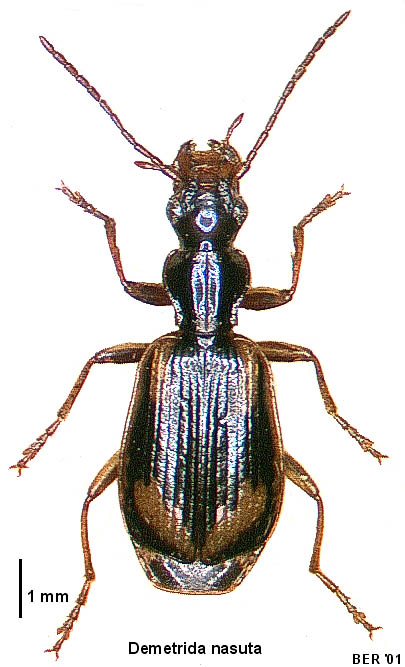
- Demetrida nasuta

Scientific classification
- Kingdom: Animalia
- Phylum: Arthropoda
- Class: Insecta
- Order: Coleoptera
- Suborder: Adephaga
- Family: Carabidae
- Subfamily: Lebiinae
- Tribe: Lebiini
- Genus: Demetrida; White, 1846

Subgenera
- Demetrida White, 1846; Xanthophaea Chaudoir, 1848

= Demetrida =

Genus of beetles

Demetrida is a genus in the beetle family Carabidae. There are more than 100 described species in Demetrida.

== Species ==
These 107 species belong to the genus Demetrida:

- Demetrida acutangula (Fauvel, 1882) (New Caledonia)
- Demetrida aitape Darlington, 1968 (Indonesia and New Guinea)
- Demetrida aiyura Darlington, 1971 (New Guinea)
- Demetrida angulata Darlington, 1968 (New Guinea and Australia)
- Demetrida angusticollis (W.J.Macleay, 1864) (Australia)
- Demetrida angustula (Chaudoir, 1873) (Australia)
- Demetrida apicalis (Sloane, 1917) (Australia)
- Demetrida basalis Darlington, 1968 (Indonesia and New Guinea)
- Demetrida brachinodera (Chaudoir, 1852) (Australia)
- Demetrida brandti Darlington, 1968 (Indonesia and New Guinea)
- Demetrida brunnea Darlington, 1968 (Indonesia and New Guinea)
- Demetrida carteri (Sloane, 1923) (Australia)
- Demetrida chaudoiri (W.J.MacLeay, 1871) (Australia)
- Demetrida concinna (Blackburn, 1901) (Australia)
- Demetrida constricticeps (Sloane, 1898) (Australia)
- Demetrida crepera Darlington, 1968 (New Guinea)
- Demetrida cylindricollis (Blackburn, 1901) (Australia)
- Demetrida demarzi (Straneo, 1960) (Australia)
- Demetrida depressa (Perroud & Montrouzier, 1864) (New Caledonia)
- Demetrida dieffenbachii (White, 1843) (New Zealand)
- Demetrida discoidalis Darlington, 1968 (Indonesia and New Guinea)
- Demetrida diversa Darlington, 1968 (New Guinea)
- Demetrida divisa Darlington, 1968 (Indonesia and New Guinea)
- Demetrida dobodura Darlington, 1968 (New Guinea)
- Demetrida doddi (Sloane, 1917) (Australia)
- Demetrida dorsalis (Sloane, 1917) (Australia)
- Demetrida duplicata Darlington, 1968 (Indonesia and New Guinea)
- Demetrida elongata (Sloane, 1898) (Australia)
- Demetrida fasciata (Sloane, 1915) (Australia)
- Demetrida filiformis (Blackburn, 1893) (Australia)
- Demetrida fumipes Darlington, 1968 (New Guinea)
- Demetrida genicula Darlington, 1968 (Indonesia and New Guinea)
- Demetrida goroka Darlington, 1968 (New Guinea)
- Demetrida grandis (Chaudoir, 1848) (Australia)
- Demetrida hollandia Darlington, 1968 (Indonesia and New Guinea)
- Demetrida humeralis Darlington, 1968 (Indonesia and New Guinea)
- Demetrida imitatrix Darlington, 1968 (Indonesia and New Guinea)
- Demetrida infuscata (Chaudoir, 1873) (Australia)
- Demetrida karimui Darlington, 1971 (New Guinea)
- Demetrida kiunga Darlington, 1968 (New Guinea)
- Demetrida kokoda Darlington, 1968 (Indonesia and New Guinea)
- Demetrida latangula Darlington, 1968 (Indonesia and New Guinea)
- Demetrida lateralis Broun, 1910 (New Zealand)
- Demetrida lepida Darlington, 1968 (Indonesia and New Guinea)
- Demetrida limbata (Fauvel, 1882)
- Demetrida lineata (Dejean, 1831) (Australia)
- Demetrida lineella White, 1846 (New Zealand)
- Demetrida lineolata (Chaudoir, 1873) (Australia)
- Demetrida longicollis (W.J.MacLeay, 1864) (Australia)
- Demetrida loweri (Blackburn, 1890) (Australia)
- Demetrida mafulu Darlington, 1968 (New Guinea)
- Demetrida magna Darlington, 1968 (Indonesia and New Guinea)
- Demetrida marginipennis (Sloane, 1917) (Australia)
- Demetrida metallica B.Moore, 1967 (Australia)
- Demetrida minor Darlington, 1968 (New Guinea)
- Demetrida moda Darlington, 1968 (New Guinea)
- Demetrida moesta Sharp, 1878 (New Zealand)
- Demetrida moluccensis Darlington, 1968 (Indonesia)
- Demetrida nasuta White, 1846 (New Zealand)
- Demetrida nigriceps Darlington, 1968 (Indonesia and New Guinea)
- Demetrida nigricincta (Sloane, 1910) (Australia)
- Demetrida nigripennis Darlington, 1968 (Indonesia and New Guinea)
- Demetrida nigripes Darlington, 1968 (Indonesia and New Guinea)
- Demetrida nubicola Darlington, 1968 (Indonesia and New Guinea)
- Demetrida obtusangula (Fauvel, 1882) (New Caledonia)
- Demetrida pallens Darlington, 1968 (Indonesia and New Guinea)
- Demetrida pallipes Darlington, 1968 (New Guinea)
- Demetrida parallela (Chaudoir, 1873) (Australia)
- Demetrida parena Darlington, 1971 (Indonesia and New Guinea)
- Demetrida piceola (Csiki, 1932) (New Caledonia)
- Demetrida picipennis (Chaudoir, 1873) (Australia)
- Demetrida pilosula (Chaudoir, 1873) (Australia)
- Demetrida prima Darlington, 1968 (New Guinea)
- Demetrida quadricollis (Sloane, 1917) (Australia)
- Demetrida recta Darlington, 1968 (Indonesia and New Guinea)
- Demetrida reversa Darlington, 1968 (Indonesia and New Guinea)
- Demetrida rex Darlington, 1968 (New Guinea)
- Demetrida saidor Darlington, 1964 (Indonesia and New Guinea)
- Demetrida satelles (Blackburn, 1893) (Australia)
- Demetrida sedlacekorum Darlington, 1968 (New Guinea)
- Demetrida seriata Darlington, 1968 (New Guinea)
- Demetrida seticollis Darlington, 1968 (Indonesia and New Guinea)
- Demetrida setosa (Sloane, 1920) (Australia)
- Demetrida sibil Darlington, 1968 (Indonesia and New Guinea)
- Demetrida similis Darlington, 1968 (New Guinea)
- Demetrida sinuata Broun, 1917 (New Zealand)
- Demetrida sublepida Darlington, 1968 (Indonesia and New Guinea)
- Demetrida submoda Darlington, 1968 (Indonesia and New Guinea)
- Demetrida subpunctata Darlington, 1968 (New Guinea)
- Demetrida subtenuis Darlington, 1968 (Indonesia and New Guinea)
- Demetrida suturata (Newman, 1842) (Australia)
- Demetrida tenuis Darlington, 1968 (New Guinea)
- Demetrida tesselata Darlington, 1968 (Indonesia and New Guinea)
- Demetrida tripuncta Darlington, 1968 (New Guinea)
- Demetrida trivittata (Sloane, 1923) (Australia)
- Demetrida truncata (Fauvel, 1882) (New Caledonia)
- Demetrida tweedensis (Blackburn, 1892) (Australia)
- Demetrida variabilis (W.J.MacLeay, 1888) (Australia)
- Demetrida variolosa B.Moore, 1967 (Australia)
- Demetrida velata Darlington, 1968 (New Guinea)
- Demetrida vigil Darlington, 1968 (New Guinea)
- Demetrida villosa Baehr, 1999 (Australia)
- Demetrida viridibasis Darlington, 1968 (Indonesia and New Guinea)
- Demetrida viridipennis Darlington, 1968 (Indonesia and New Guinea)
- Demetrida vittata (Dejean, 1831) (Australia)
- Demetrida wau Darlington, 1968 (Indonesia and New Guinea)
- Demetrida wilsoni (Sloane, 1923) (Australia)
