= Demetrida karimui =

Scientific classification
- Kingdom: Animalia
- Phylum: Arthropoda
- Class: Insecta
- Order: Coleoptera
- Suborder: Adephaga
- Family: Carabidae
- Genus: Demetrida
- Species: D. karimui

Binomial name
- Demetrida karimui Darlington, 1971

Species of beetle

Demetrida karimui is a species of ground beetle in the Lebiinae subfamily. It was described by Darlington in 1971 and is endemic to New Guinea.
