= Demetrida acutangula =

Scientific classification
- Kingdom: Animalia
- Phylum: Arthropoda
- Clade: Pancrustacea
- Class: Insecta
- Order: Coleoptera
- Suborder: Adephaga
- Family: Carabidae
- Genus: Demetrida
- Species: D. acutangula

Binomial name
- Demetrida acutangula (Fauvel, 1882)

Synonyms
- Xanthophaea acutangula (Fauvel, 1882)

Species of beetle

Demetrida acutangula is a species of ground beetle in Lebiinae subfamily. It is endemic to New Caledonia.
