= Demetrida obtusangula =

Scientific classification
- Kingdom: Animalia
- Phylum: Arthropoda
- Clade: Pancrustacea
- Class: Insecta
- Order: Coleoptera
- Suborder: Adephaga
- Family: Carabidae
- Genus: Demetrida
- Species: D. obtusangula

Binomial name
- Demetrida obtusangula (Fauvel, 1882)

Synonyms
- Xanthophaea obtusangula Fauvel, 1882

Species of beetle

Demetrida obtusangula is a species of ground beetle in the Lebiinae subfamily. It is endemic to New Caledonia.
