= Demetrida dorsalis =

Scientific classification
- Kingdom: Animalia
- Phylum: Arthropoda
- Class: Insecta
- Order: Coleoptera
- Suborder: Adephaga
- Family: Carabidae
- Genus: Demetrida
- Species: D. dorsalis

Binomial name
- Demetrida dorsalis (Darlington, 1968)

Synonyms
- Xanthophaea dorsalis (Sloane, 1917)

Species of beetle

Demetrida dorsalis is a species of ground beetle in Lebiinae subfamily. It was first described by Darlington in 1968 and is endemic to New Guinea.
