= Demetrida aiyura =

Scientific classification
- Kingdom: Animalia
- Phylum: Arthropoda
- Class: Insecta
- Order: Coleoptera
- Suborder: Adephaga
- Family: Carabidae
- Genus: Demetrida
- Species: D. aiyura

Binomial name
- Demetrida aiyura Darlington, 1971

Species of beetle

Demetrida aiyura is a species of ground beetle in the Lebiinae subfamily. It was described by Darlington in 1991 and is endemic to New Guinea.
