= Demetrida humeralis =

Scientific classification
- Kingdom: Animalia
- Phylum: Arthropoda
- Class: Insecta
- Order: Coleoptera
- Suborder: Adephaga
- Family: Carabidae
- Genus: Demetrida
- Species: D. humeralis

Binomial name
- Demetrida humeralis Darlington, 1968

Species of beetle

Demetrida humeralis is a species of ground beetle in the Lebiinae subfamily. It was described by Darlington in 1968 and is found in Indonesia and New Guinea.
