= Demetrida depressa =

Scientific classification
- Kingdom: Animalia
- Phylum: Arthropoda
- Clade: Pancrustacea
- Class: Insecta
- Order: Coleoptera
- Suborder: Adephaga
- Family: Carabidae
- Genus: Demetrida
- Species: D. depressa

Binomial name
- Demetrida depressa (Perroud and Montrouzier, 1864)

Synonyms
- Demetrida satanas (Britton, 1936), Parallelomorpha depressa Perroud and Montrouzier, 1864, Xanthophaea depressa (Perroud and Montrouzier, 1864), Xanthophaea satanas Britton, 1936

Species of beetle

Demetrida depressa is a species of ground beetle in the Lebiinae subfamily. It is endemic to New Caledonia.
