= Demetrida pallipes =

Scientific classification
- Kingdom: Animalia
- Phylum: Arthropoda
- Class: Insecta
- Order: Coleoptera
- Suborder: Adephaga
- Family: Carabidae
- Genus: Demetrida
- Species: D. pallipes

Binomial name
- Demetrida pallipes Darlington, 1968

Species of beetle

Demetrida pallipes is a species of ground beetle in the Lebiinae subfamily. It was described by Darlington in 1968 and is an endemic species of New Guinea.
