= Demetrida limbata =

Scientific classification
- Kingdom: Animalia
- Phylum: Arthropoda
- Class: Insecta
- Order: Coleoptera
- Suborder: Adephaga
- Family: Carabidae
- Genus: Demetrida
- Species: D. limbata

Binomial name
- Demetrida limbata (Fauvel, 1882)

Synonyms
- Xanthophaea limbata (Fauvel, 1882)

Species of beetle

Demetrida limbata is a species of ground beetle in the Lebiinae subfamily. It was described by Fauvel in 1882.
