= Pristacrus =

Scientific classification
- Domain: Eukaryota
- Kingdom: Animalia
- Phylum: Arthropoda
- Class: Insecta
- Order: Coleoptera
- Suborder: Adephaga
- Family: Carabidae
- Subfamily: Lebiinae
- Tribe: Lebiini
- Subtribe: Pericalina
- Genus: Pristacrus; Chaudoir, 1870

Genus of beetles

Pristacrus is a genus in the beetle family Carabidae. There are about five described species in Pristacrus, found in Madagascar.

== Species ==
These five species belong to the genus Pristacrus:

- Pristacrus binotatus (Klug, 1833)
- Pristacrus laticollis (Gory & Laporte, 1837)
- Pristacrus ranomafanae Kavanaugh & Rainio, 2016
- Pristacrus rotundatus (Fairmaire, 1892)
- Pristacrus semipiceus (Fairmaire, 1887)
