= Eurydera =

Scientific classification
- Domain: Eukaryota
- Kingdom: Animalia
- Phylum: Arthropoda
- Class: Insecta
- Order: Coleoptera
- Suborder: Adephaga
- Family: Carabidae
- Subfamily: Lebiinae
- Tribe: Lebiini
- Subtribe: Pericalina
- Genus: Eurydera; Laporte, 1831

Genus of beetles

Eurydera is a genus in the beetle family Carabidae. There are more than 30 described species in Eurydera, found in Madagascar.

== Species ==
These 34 species belong to the genus Eurydera:

- Eurydera acutispina (Fairmaire, 1869)
- Eurydera alluaudi Jeannel, 1949
- Eurydera ambreana Mateu, 1973
- Eurydera armata Laporte, 1831
- Eurydera bimaculata Jeannel, 1949
- Eurydera catalai Jeannel, 1949
- Eurydera crispatifrons (Fairmaire, 1896)
- Eurydera cuspidata (Klug, 1835)
- Eurydera ebenina Mateu, 1973
- Eurydera femorata (Klug, 1833)
- Eurydera fossulata Mateu, 1973
- Eurydera foveicollis Jeannel, 1949
- Eurydera heimi Jeannel, 1949
- Eurydera inermis Laporte, 1835
- Eurydera jeanneli Mateu, 1973
- Eurydera latipennis (Klug, 1835)
- Eurydera longispina Jeannel, 1949
- Eurydera lugubrina Fairmaire, 1899
- Eurydera madecassa Mateu, 1973
- Eurydera mormolycoides Coquerel, 1851
- Eurydera ocellata Kavanaugh & Rainio, 2016
- Eurydera ocularis (Fairmaire, 1869)
- Eurydera olsoufieffi Jeannel, 1949
- Eurydera oracle Kavanaugh & Rainio, 2016
- Eurydera ornatipennis (Fairmaire, 1897)
- Eurydera peyrierasi Mateu, 1973
- Eurydera rufotincta (Fairmaire, 1869)
- Eurydera rugiceps Jeannel, 1949
- Eurydera sicardi Jeannel, 1949
- Eurydera simplica Kavanaugh & Rainio, 2016
- Eurydera sublaevis Laporte, 1835
- Eurydera sulcicollis Mateu, 1973
- Eurydera suturalis Jeannel, 1949
- Eurydera unicolor (Klug, 1833)
