= Demetrida fasciata =

Scientific classification
- Kingdom: Animalia
- Phylum: Arthropoda
- Class: Insecta
- Order: Coleoptera
- Suborder: Adephaga
- Family: Carabidae
- Genus: Demetrida
- Species: D. fasciata

Binomial name
- Demetrida fasciata (Sloane, 1915)

Synonyms
- Xanthophaea fasciata (Sloane, 1915)

Species of beetle

Demetrida fasciata is a species of ground beetle in the Lebiinae subfamily. It was described by Sloane in 1915 and is endemic to Australia.
