= Valeriaaschero =

Scientific classification
- Kingdom: Animalia
- Phylum: Arthropoda
- Class: Insecta
- Order: Coleoptera
- Suborder: Adephaga
- Family: Carabidae
- Subfamily: Lebiinae
- Genus: Valeriaaschero; Erwin, 2004

Genus of beetles

Valeriaaschero is a genus of beetles in the family Carabidae, containing the following species:

- Valeriaaschero flora Erwin, 2004
- Valeriaaschero nigrita Erwin, 2004
