= Demetrida lateralis =

Scientific classification
- Kingdom: Animalia
- Phylum: Arthropoda
- Class: Insecta
- Order: Coleoptera
- Suborder: Adephaga
- Family: Carabidae
- Genus: Demetrida
- Species: D. lateralis

Binomial name
- Demetrida lateralis Broun, 1910

Species of beetle

Demetrida lateralis is a species of ground beetle in the Lebiinae subfamily. It was described by Thomas Broun in 1910 and is endemic to New Zealand.
