= Demetrida metallica =

Scientific classification
- Kingdom: Animalia
- Phylum: Arthropoda
- Class: Insecta
- Order: Coleoptera
- Suborder: Adephaga
- Family: Carabidae
- Genus: Demetrida
- Species: D. metallica

Binomial name
- Demetrida metallica Moore, 1967

Species of beetle

Demetrida metallica is a species of ground beetle in the Lebiinae subfamily. It was described by Barry Philip Moore in 1967 and is found in Australia.
