= Coptoglossus =

Scientific classification
- Domain: Eukaryota
- Kingdom: Animalia
- Phylum: Arthropoda
- Class: Insecta
- Order: Coleoptera
- Suborder: Adephaga
- Family: Carabidae
- Subfamily: Lebiinae
- Tribe: Lebiini
- Subtribe: Pericalina
- Genus: Coptoglossus; Chaudoir, 1870

Genus of beetles

Coptoglossus is a genus in the beetle family Carabidae. There are about five described species in Coptoglossus, found in Australia.

== Species ==
These five species belong to the genus Coptoglossus:

- Coptoglossus carteri (Sloane, 1915)
- Coptoglossus excisicollis Baehr, 2012
- Coptoglossus leichhardti Baehr, 2013
- Coptoglossus porphyriacus (Sloane, 1910)
- Coptoglossus sulcatulus Chaudoir, 1870
