= Merizomena =

Scientific classification
- Domain: Eukaryota
- Kingdom: Animalia
- Phylum: Arthropoda
- Class: Insecta
- Order: Coleoptera
- Suborder: Adephaga
- Family: Carabidae
- Subfamily: Lebiinae
- Tribe: Lebiini
- Subtribe: Agrina
- Genus: Merizomena; Chaudoir, 1873

Genus of beetles

Merizomena is a genus in the beetle family Carabidae. There are about 13 described species in Merizomena.

== Species ==
These 13 species belong to the genus Merizomena:

- Merizomena afgana (Jedlicka, 1956) (Afghanistan)
- Merizomena arabica (Mateu, 1986) (Saudi Arabia)
- Merizomena basalis (Chaudoir, 1852) (Turkey)
- Merizomena buettikeri (Mateu, 1986) (Saudi Arabia)
- Merizomena castanea (Klug, 1832) (Middle East)
- Merizomena dimidiata (Ménétriés, 1848) (Kazakhstan and Uzbekistan)
- Merizomena grandinella (Semenov, 1889) (Iran and Turkmenistan)
- Merizomena klapperichi (Jedlicka, 1956) (Middle East, Afghanistan, and Pakistan)
- Merizomena schoenemanni (Kirschenhofer, 1994) (Iran)
- Merizomena silvatica Mikhailov, 1977 (Tadzhikistan)
- Merizomena tricolor (Gebler, 1845) (Kazakhstan, Uzbekistan, and Kyrgyzstan)
- Merizomena tschitscherini (Semenov, 1900) (Central Asia)
- Merizomena yemenita (Mateu, 1986) (Yemen)
