= Microdaccus =

Scientific classification
- Kingdom: Animalia
- Phylum: Arthropoda
- Class: Insecta
- Order: Coleoptera
- Suborder: Adephaga
- Family: Carabidae
- Subfamily: Lebiinae
- Genus: Microdaccus; Schaum, 1864

Genus of beetles

Microdaccus is a genus of beetles in the family Carabidae, containing the following species:

- Microdaccus escalerai Morvan, 1977
- Microdaccus glasunovi Emetz, 1979
- Microdaccus opacicolor (Reitter, 1897)
- Microdaccus opacus (Schaum, 1857)
- Microdaccus pulchellus Schaum, 1864
- Microdaccus teodoroi Gridelli, 1930
