= Stenotelus =

Scientific classification
- Domain: Eukaryota
- Kingdom: Animalia
- Phylum: Arthropoda
- Class: Insecta
- Order: Coleoptera
- Suborder: Adephaga
- Family: Carabidae
- Subfamily: Lebiinae
- Tribe: Lebiini
- Subtribe: Pericalina
- Genus: Stenotelus; Bouchard, 1903

Genus of beetles

Stenotelus is a genus in the ground beetle family Carabidae. There are at least three described species in Stenotelus.

== Species ==
These three species belong to the genus Stenotelus:

- Stenotelus opacus Bouchard, 1903 (Malaysia, Indonesia, Borneo, Philippines)
- Stenotelus piceus Louwerens, 1952 (Indonesia)
- Stenotelus spinosus Darlington, 1968 (Indonesia, New Guinea)
