= Nycteis =

Scientific classification
- Domain: Eukaryota
- Kingdom: Animalia
- Phylum: Arthropoda
- Class: Insecta
- Order: Coleoptera
- Suborder: Adephaga
- Family: Carabidae
- Subfamily: Lebiinae
- Tribe: Lebiini
- Subtribe: Pericalina
- Genus: Nycteis; Laporte, 1835

Subgenera
- Belonognatha Chaudoir, 1843; Nycteis Laporte, 1835

Synonyms
- Beleopterus Klug, 1835

Genus of beetles

Nycteis is a genus in the ground beetle family Carabidae. There are about 15 described species in Nycteis, found in Madagascar.

== Species ==
These 15 species belong to the genus Nycteis:

- Nycteis alluaudi (Jeannel, 1949)
- Nycteis apicalis (Fairmaire, 1904)
- Nycteis brevicollis Laporte, 1834
- Nycteis chloroptera (Alluaud, 1936)
- Nycteis diegana (Jeannel, 1949)
- Nycteis lampra (Alluaud, 1936)
- Nycteis latiuscula Fairmaire, 1901
- Nycteis madagascariensis (Gory, 1833)
- Nycteis posticalis Fairmaire, 1901
- Nycteis posticula (Alluaud, 1936)
- Nycteis pustulata (Chaudoir, 1843)
- Nycteis scapulata Fairmaire, 1901
- Nycteis sicardi (Jeannel, 1949)
- Nycteis signatipennis (Chaudoir, 1870)
- Nycteis stellulata (Fairmaire, 1897)
