= Lobodontidius =

Lobodontidius congoanus

Scientific classification
- Kingdom: Animalia
- Phylum: Arthropoda
- Class: Insecta
- Order: Coleoptera
- Suborder: Adephaga
- Family: Carabidae
- Subfamily: Lebiinae
- Genus: Lobodontidius; Basilewsky, 1970
- Species: L. congoanus

Binomial name
- Lobodontidius congoanus (Basilewsky, 1948)

Genus of beetles

Lobodontidius congoanus is a species of beetle in the family Carabidae, the only species in the genus Lobodontidius.
