= Demetrida infuscata =

Scientific classification
- Kingdom: Animalia
- Phylum: Arthropoda
- Class: Insecta
- Order: Coleoptera
- Suborder: Adephaga
- Family: Carabidae
- Genus: Demetrida
- Species: D. infuscata

Binomial name
- Demetrida infuscata (Chaudoir, 1873)

Synonyms
- Xanthophaea infuscata (Chaudoir, 1873)

Species of beetle

Demetrida infuscata is a species of ground beetle in the Lebiinae subfamily. It was described by Chaudoir in 1873 and is endemic to Australia.
