= Demetrida piceola =

Scientific classification
- Kingdom: Animalia
- Phylum: Arthropoda
- Clade: Pancrustacea
- Class: Insecta
- Order: Coleoptera
- Suborder: Adephaga
- Family: Carabidae
- Genus: Demetrida
- Species: D. piceola

Binomial name
- Demetrida piceola (Csiki, 1932)

Synonyms
- Cymindis picea Montrouzier, 1860; Demetrida picea Montrouzier, 1860; Plochionus piceus Montrouzier, 1860; Xanthophaea piceola Csiki, 1932

Species of beetle

Demetrida piceola is a species of ground beetle in the Lebiinae subfamily. It is an endemic species of New Caledonia.
