= Demetrida cylindricollis =

Scientific classification
- Kingdom: Animalia
- Phylum: Arthropoda
- Class: Insecta
- Order: Coleoptera
- Suborder: Adephaga
- Family: Carabidae
- Genus: Demetrida
- Species: D. cylindricollis

Binomial name
- Demetrida cylindricollis (Blackburn, 1901)

Synonyms
- Xanthophaea cylindricollis (Blackburn, 1901)

Species of beetle

Demetrida cylindricollis is a species of ground beetle in the Lebiinae subfamily. It was described by Blackburn in 1901 and is found in Australia.
