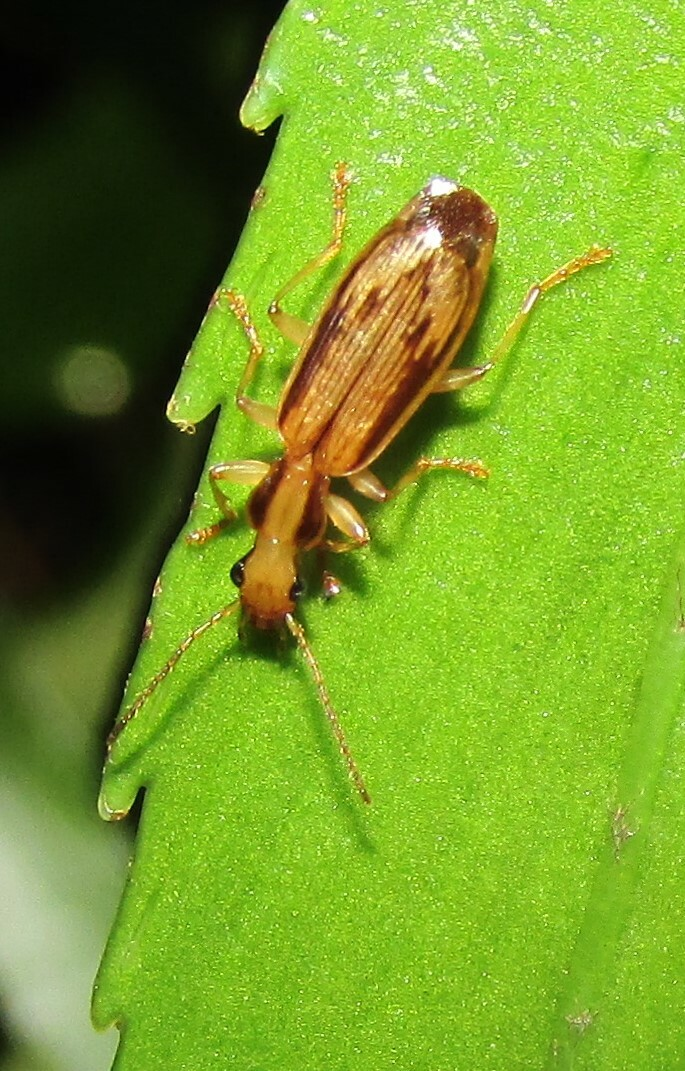

Scientific classification
- Kingdom: Animalia
- Phylum: Arthropoda
- Class: Insecta
- Order: Coleoptera
- Suborder: Adephaga
- Family: Carabidae
- Genus: Demetrida
- Species: D. lineella

Binomial name
- Demetrida lineella White, 1846

= Demetrida lineella =

Species of beetle

Demetrida lineella is a species of ground beetle in the Lebiinae subfamily. It was described by White in 1846 and is endemic to New Zealand.
