= Labocephalus =

Scientific classification
- Domain: Eukaryota
- Kingdom: Animalia
- Phylum: Arthropoda
- Class: Insecta
- Order: Coleoptera
- Suborder: Adephaga
- Family: Carabidae
- Subfamily: Lebiinae
- Tribe: Lebiini
- Subtribe: Pericalina
- Genus: Labocephalus; Chaudoir, 1848

Synonyms
- Lobocephalus Chaudoir, 1848; Plateimatus Jeannel, 1949

Genus of beetles

Labocephalus is a genus in the ground beetle family Carabidae. There are at least four described species in Labocephalus, found in Madagascar.

== Species ==
These four species belong to the genus Labocephalus:

- Labocephalus longipennis (Laporte, 1835)
- Labocephalus occipitalis Jeannel, 1949
- Labocephalus platysomus Alluaud, 1918
- Labocephalus striatus (Guérin-Méneville, 1832)
