= Clivina grata =

Scientific classification
- Domain: Eukaryota
- Kingdom: Animalia
- Phylum: Arthropoda
- Class: Insecta
- Order: Coleoptera
- Suborder: Adephaga
- Family: Carabidae
- Genus: Clivina
- Species: C. grata

Binomial name
- Clivina grata Darlington, 1953

Species of beetle

Clivina grata is a species of ground beetle in the subfamily Scaritinae. It was described by Darlington in 1953.
