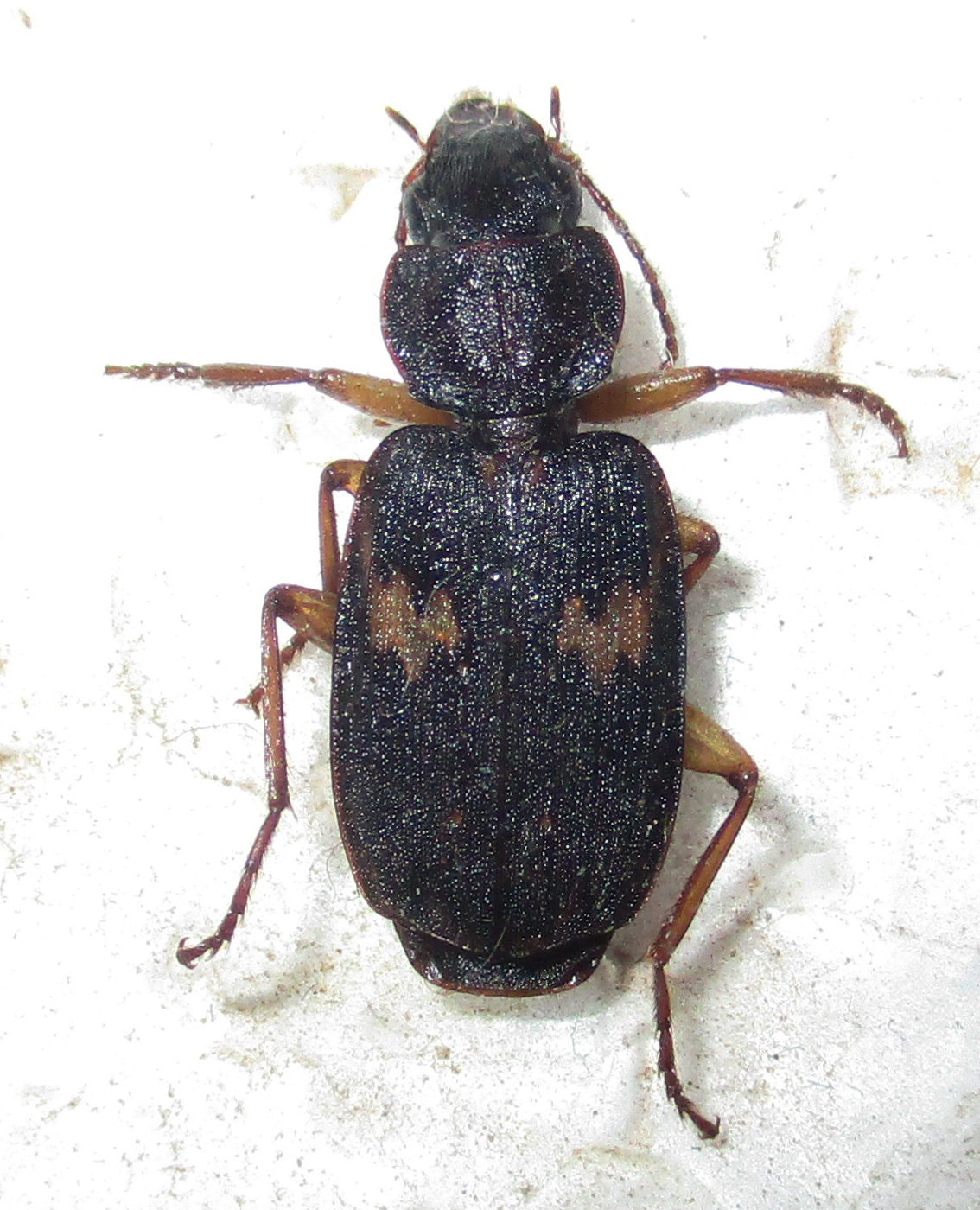
- Cymindoidea, Botswana

Scientific classification
- Domain: Eukaryota
- Kingdom: Animalia
- Phylum: Arthropoda
- Class: Insecta
- Order: Coleoptera
- Suborder: Adephaga
- Family: Carabidae
- Subfamily: Lebiinae
- Tribe: Lebiini
- Subtribe: Apenina
- Genus: Cymindoidea; Laporte, 1833

Synonyms
- Philotecnus Mannerheim, 1837

= Cymindoidea =

Genus of beetles

Cymindoidea is a genus in the ground beetle family Carabidae. There are about 15 described species in Cymindoidea, found in southern Asia and Africa.

== Species ==
These 15 species belong to the genus Cymindoidea:

- Cymindoidea aequa Andrewes, 1923 (India)
- Cymindoidea bisignata (Dejean, 1831) (Senegal/Gambia, Guinea, Sierra Leone, Ivory Coast, Togo, Chad, Central African Republic, Sudan)
- Cymindoidea chinensis Jedlicka, 1935 (China)
- Cymindoidea decellei Basilewsky, 1961 (DR Congo)
- Cymindoidea deplanata (Boheman, 1848) (Guinea, Botswana, Namibia, South Africa)
- Cymindoidea distigma Chaudoir, 1875 (India)
- Cymindoidea humeralis Péringuey, 1898 (South Africa)
- Cymindoidea indica (Schmidt-Goebel, 1846) (Nepal, India, Myanmar)
- Cymindoidea kochi Basilewsky, 1961 (Namibia)
- Cymindoidea munda Andrewes, 1923 (Sri Lanka, India)
- Cymindoidea nigra Chaudoir, 1875 (India)
- Cymindoidea regularis Basilewsky, 1961 (DR Congo, Namibia)
- Cymindoidea triangulifera (Buquet, 1835) (Senegal/Gambia)
- Cymindoidea tutelina (Buquet, 1835) (Senegal/Gambia, Mali, Kenya)
- Cymindoidea virgulifera Chaudoir, 1875 (Africa)
