= Demetrida apicalis =

Scientific classification
- Kingdom: Animalia
- Phylum: Arthropoda
- Class: Insecta
- Order: Coleoptera
- Suborder: Adephaga
- Family: Carabidae
- Genus: Demetrida
- Species: D. apicalis

Binomial name
- Demetrida apicalis (Sloane, 1917)

Synonyms
- Xanthophaea apicalis (Sloane, 1917)

Species of beetle

Demetrida apicalis is a species of ground beetle in Lebiinae subfamily. It was described by Sloane in 1917 and is endemic to Australia.
