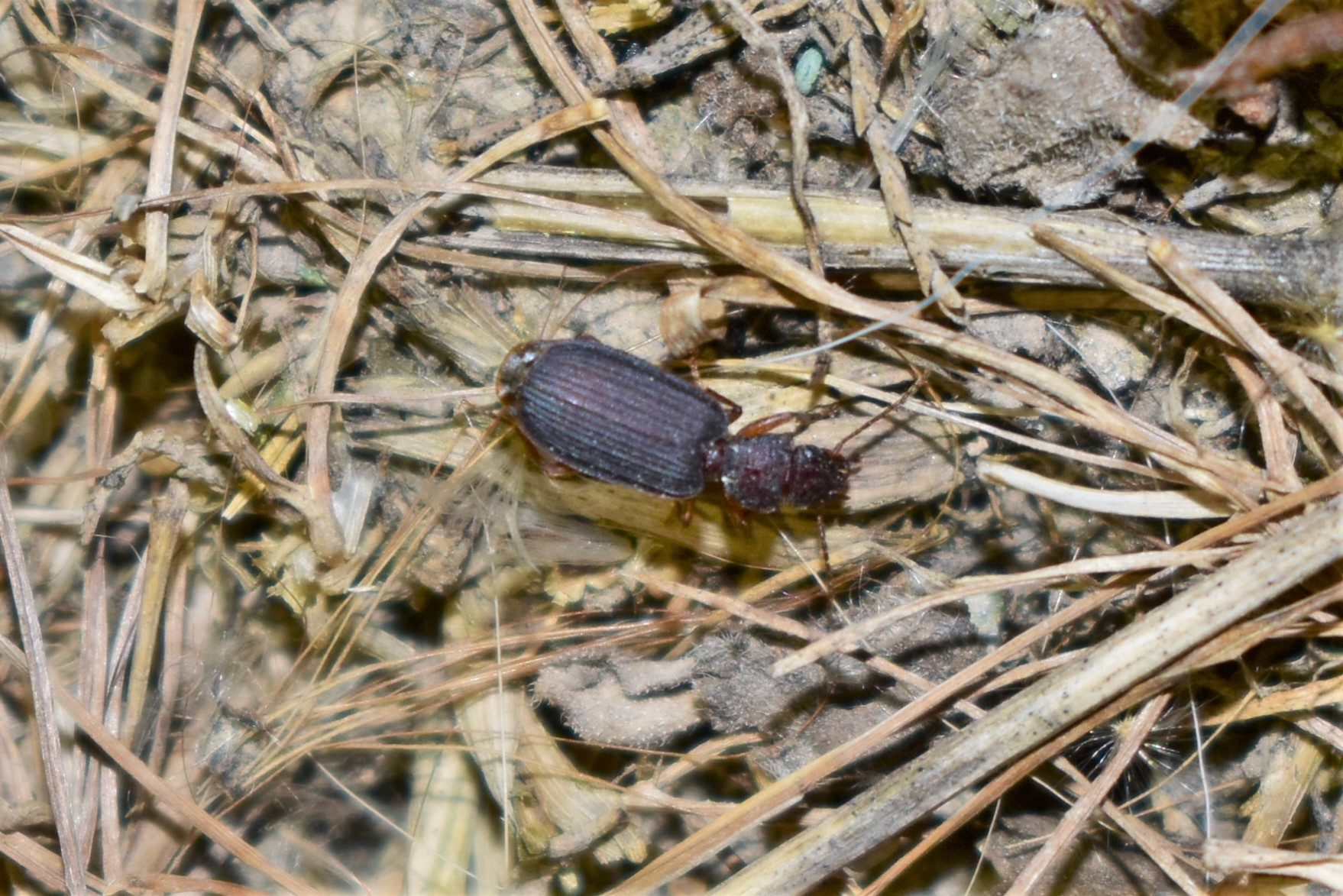
- Platytarus faminii, Қазақстан

Scientific classification
- Kingdom: Animalia
- Phylum: Arthropoda
- Class: Insecta
- Order: Coleoptera
- Suborder: Adephaga
- Family: Carabidae
- Subfamily: Lebiinae
- Tribe: Lebiini
- Subtribe: Apenina
- Genus: Platytarus; Fairmaire, 1850

Synonyms
- Platytarsus Schaum, 1851

= Platytarus =

Genus of beetles

Platytarus is a genus in the ground beetle family Carabidae. There are about 12 described species in Platytarus.

== Species ==
These 12 species belong to the genus Platytarus:

- Platytarus boysii (Chaudoir, 1850) (Asia)
- Platytarus bucculentus Andrewes, 1935 (India)
- Platytarus bufo (Fabricius, 1801) (Mediterranean)
- Platytarus compsus Andrewes, 1936 (Indonesia)
- Platytarus congobelgicus Basilewsky, 1961 (DR Congo)
- Platytarus dicraeus Andrewes, 1935 (India)
- Platytarus faminii (Dejean, 1826) (Europe, Asia, North Africa)
- Platytarus gracilis (Dejean, 1831) (Spain, Morocco, Israel, Canary Islands)
- Platytarus planulatus (Bates, 1892) (Myanmar)
- Platytarus porcatus Andrewes, 1923 (India)
- Platytarus reichei (Chaudoir, 1875) (Egypt, Israel, Syria)
- Platytarus tessellatus (Dejean, 1831) (Africa)
