= Brachynopterus =

Brachynopterus rufulus

Scientific classification
- Kingdom: Animalia
- Phylum: Arthropoda
- Class: Insecta
- Order: Coleoptera
- Suborder: Adephaga
- Family: Carabidae
- Subfamily: Lebiinae
- Genus: Brachynopterus; Bedel, 1898
- Species: B. rufulus

Binomial name
- Brachynopterus rufulus Bedel, 1898

Genus of beetles

Brachynopterus rufulus is a species of beetle in the family Carabidae, the only species in the genus Brachynopterus.
