= Demetrida demarzi =

Scientific classification
- Kingdom: Animalia
- Phylum: Arthropoda
- Class: Insecta
- Order: Coleoptera
- Suborder: Adephaga
- Family: Carabidae
- Genus: Demetrida
- Species: D. demarzi

Binomial name
- Demetrida demarzi (Straneo, 1960)

Synonyms
- Xanthophaea demarzi (Straneo, 1960)

Species of beetle

Demetrida demarzi is a species of ground beetle in the Lebiinae subfamily. It was described by Straneo in 1960 and is found in Australia.
