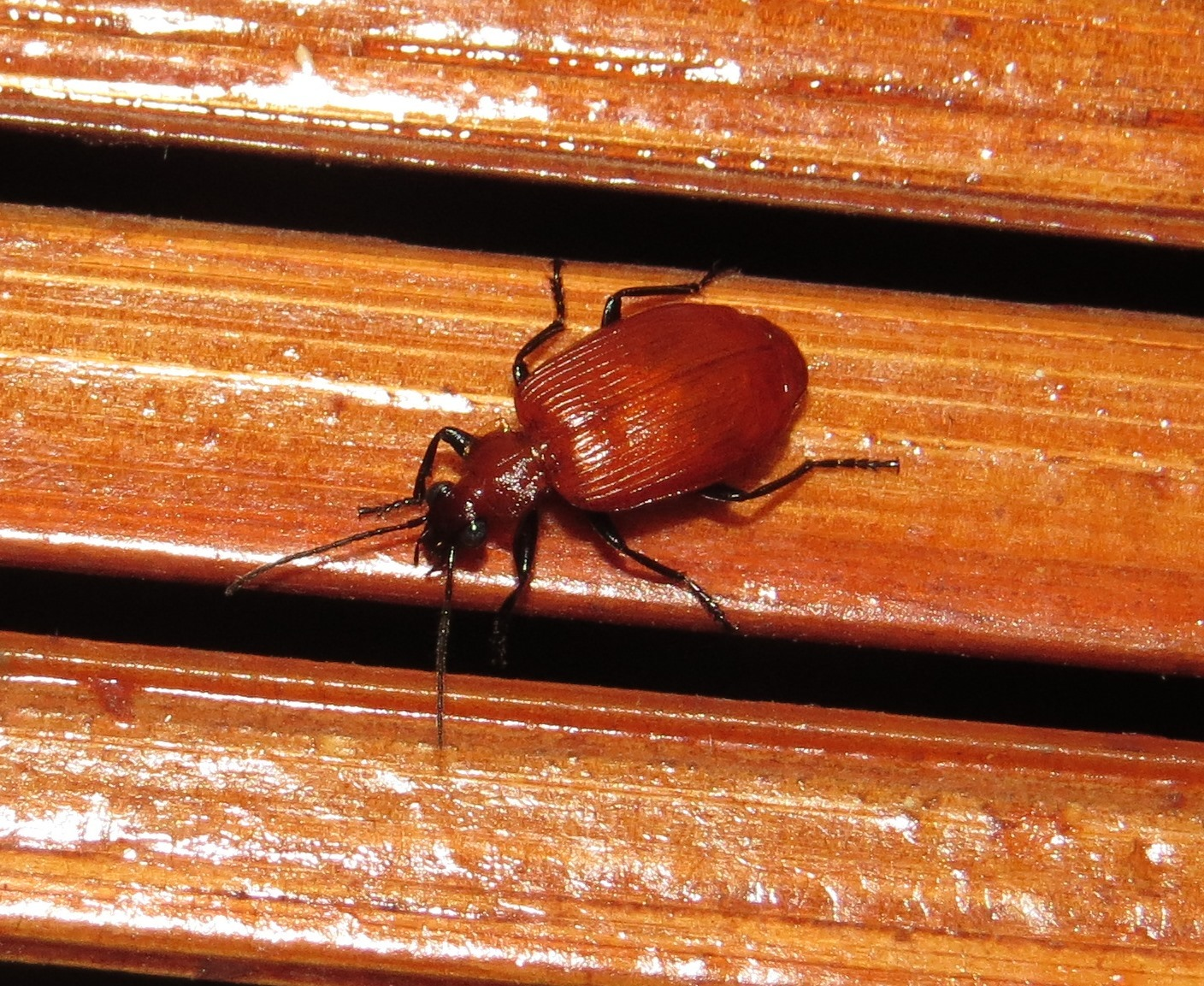
- Lebiomorphica sanguinolenta, South Africa

Scientific classification
- Domain: Eukaryota
- Kingdom: Animalia
- Phylum: Arthropoda
- Class: Insecta
- Order: Coleoptera
- Suborder: Adephaga
- Family: Carabidae
- Subfamily: Lebiinae
- Tribe: Lebiini
- Subtribe: Lebiina
- Genus: Lebiomorphica; Lorenz, 1998

Synonyms
- Lebiomorpha G.Müller, 1942

= Lebiomorphica =

Genus of beetles

Lebiomorphica is a genus in the ground beetle family Carabidae. There are at least two described species in Lebiomorphica.

== Species ==
These two species belong to the genus Lebiomorphica:

- Lebiomorphica ochreorufa (Fairmaire, 1887) (Somalia, Kenya, Rwanda, Tanzania)
- Lebiomorphica sanguinolenta (Basilewsky, 1955) (DR Congo, Zimbabwe, South Africa)
