= Madecassina =

Scientific classification
- Domain: Eukaryota
- Kingdom: Animalia
- Phylum: Arthropoda
- Class: Insecta
- Order: Coleoptera
- Suborder: Adephaga
- Family: Carabidae
- Subfamily: Lebiinae
- Tribe: Lebiini
- Subtribe: Pericalina
- Genus: Madecassina; Jeannel, 1949

Genus of beetles

Madecassina is a genus in the beetle family Carabidae. There are about 12 described species in Madecassina, found in Madagascar.

== Species ==
These 12 species belong to the genus Madecassina:

- Madecassina alluaudi Jeannel, 1949
- Madecassina angusticollis (Alluaud, 1899)
- Madecassina bimaculata Kavanaugh & Rainio, 2016
- Madecassina curta (Alluaud, 1935)
- Madecassina maculata (Alluaud, 1899)
- Madecassina occipitalis Jeannel, 1949
- Madecassina permira (Alluaud, 1935)
- Madecassina picta (Alluaud, 1897)
- Madecassina puncticollis Jeannel, 1949
- Madecassina quadrimaculata Kavanaugh & Rainio, 2016
- Madecassina sicardi Jeannel, 1949
- Madecassina tanala (Alluaud, 1935)
