= Demetrida elongata =

Scientific classification
- Kingdom: Animalia
- Phylum: Arthropoda
- Class: Insecta
- Order: Coleoptera
- Suborder: Adephaga
- Family: Carabidae
- Genus: Demetrida
- Species: D. elongata

Binomial name
- Demetrida elongata (Sloane, 1898)

Synonyms
- Xanthophaea elongata (Sloane, 1898)

Species of beetle

Demetrida elongata is a species of ground beetle in the Lebiinae subfamily. It was described by Sloane in 1898 and is endemic to Australia.
