= Demetrida angustula =

Scientific classification
- Kingdom: Animalia
- Phylum: Arthropoda
- Class: Insecta
- Order: Coleoptera
- Suborder: Adephaga
- Family: Carabidae
- Genus: Demetrida
- Species: D. angustula

Binomial name
- Demetrida angustula (Chaudoir, 1872)

Species of beetle

Demetrida angustula is a species of ground beetle in Lebiinae subfamily. It was described by Chaudoir in 1872 and is endemic to Australia.
