= Demetrida angusticollis =

Scientific classification
- Kingdom: Animalia
- Phylum: Arthropoda
- Class: Insecta
- Order: Coleoptera
- Suborder: Adephaga
- Family: Carabidae
- Genus: Demetrida
- Species: D. angusticollis

Binomial name
- Demetrida angusticollis (W. J. Macleay, 1864)

Species of beetle

Demetrida angulata is a species of ground beetle in subfamily Lebiinae. It was described by William John Macleay in 1864 and is found in Australia.
