= Demetrida longicollis =

Scientific classification
- Kingdom: Animalia
- Phylum: Arthropoda
- Class: Insecta
- Order: Coleoptera
- Suborder: Adephaga
- Family: Carabidae
- Genus: Demetrida
- Species: D. longicollis

Binomial name
- Demetrida longicollis (W. J. Macleay, 1864)

Synonyms
- Cymindis longicollis (W. J. Macleay, 1864), Demetrias rufescens (W. J. Macleay, 1864), Demetrida ferruginea (Chaudoir, 1873), Demetrida rufescens (Chaudoir, 1887), Xanthophaea ferruginea (Chaudoir, 1873), Xanthophaea longicollis (W. J. Macleay, 1864)

Species of beetle

Demetrida longicollis is a species of ground beetle in the subfamily Lebiinae. It was described by William John Macleay in 1864 and is found in Australia.
