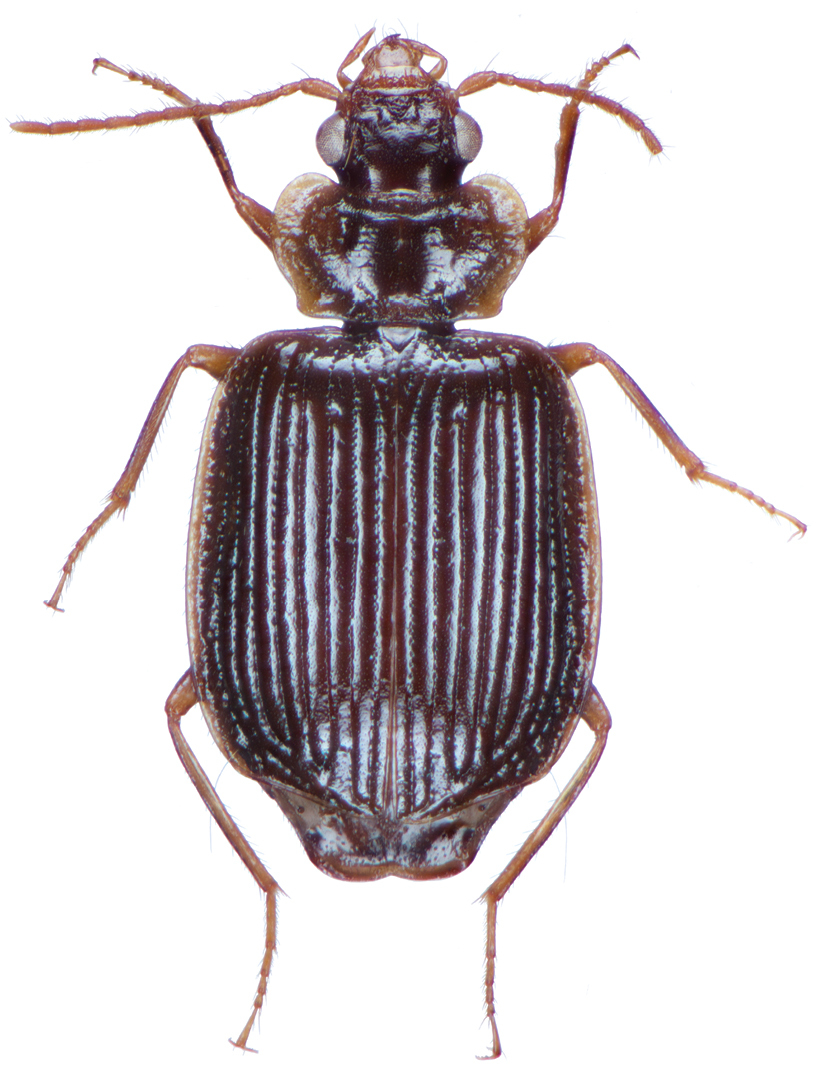
- Formosiella brunnea

Scientific classification
- Domain: Eukaryota
- Kingdom: Animalia
- Phylum: Arthropoda
- Class: Insecta
- Order: Coleoptera
- Suborder: Adephaga
- Family: Carabidae
- Subfamily: Lebiinae
- Tribe: Lebiini
- Subtribe: Pericalina
- Genus: Formosiella; Jedlicka, 1951

Synonyms
- Pseudomenarus Shibata, 1964

= Formosiella =

Genus of beetles

Formosiella is a genus of ground beetles in the family Carabidae. There are at least four described species in Formosiella.

== Species ==
These four species belong to the genus Formosiella:

- Formosiella brunnea Jedlicka, 1951
- Formosiella flavomaculata (Shibata, 1964)
- Formosiella sichuanensis Kirschenhofer, 2012
- Formosiella vietnami Kirschenhofer, 1994
