= Habutarus =

Scientific classification
- Domain: Eukaryota
- Kingdom: Animalia
- Phylum: Arthropoda
- Class: Insecta
- Order: Coleoptera
- Suborder: Adephaga
- Family: Carabidae
- Subfamily: Lebiinae
- Tribe: Lebiini
- Subtribe: Apenina
- Genus: Habutarus; Ball & Hilchie, 1983

Subgenera
- Habutarus Ball & Hilchie, 1983; Setitarus Baehr, 2008

Synonyms
- Setitarus Baehr, 2008

Genus of beetles

Habutarus is a genus of carabids in the beetle family Carabidae. There are more than 20 described species in Habutarus, found in Australia and New Guinea.

== Species ==
These 23 species belong to the genus Habutarus:

- Habutarus abboti Baehr, 2008 (Australia)
- Habutarus calderi Baehr, 2008 (Australia)
- Habutarus canaliculatus Baehr, 2008 (Australia)
- Habutarus chillagoensis Baehr, 2008 (Australia)
- Habutarus convexipennis Baehr, 2008 (Australia)
- Habutarus crassiceps (W.J.MacLeay, 1871) (Australia)
- Habutarus demarzi Baehr, 2008 (Australia)
- Habutarus eungellae Baehr, 2008 (Australia)
- Habutarus iridipennis Baehr, 2008 (Australia)
- Habutarus kirramae Baehr, 2008 (Australia)
- Habutarus laticeps Baehr, 2008 (Australia)
- Habutarus madang Baehr, 2008 (New Guinea)
- Habutarus monteithi Baehr, 2008 (Australia)
- Habutarus morosus (Sloane, 1915) (Australia)
- Habutarus nitidicollis Baehr, 2008 (Australia)
- Habutarus opacipennis Baehr, 2008 (Australia)
- Habutarus papua (Darlington, 1968) (New Guinea)
- Habutarus parviceps Baehr, 2008 (Australia)
- Habutarus pilosus (Baehr, 1996) (New Guinea)
- Habutarus punctatipennis Baehr, 2008 (Australia)
- Habutarus rugosipennis Baehr, 2008 (Australia)
- Habutarus wau Baehr, 2008 (New Guinea)
- Habutarus weiri Baehr, 2008 (Australia)
