= Demetrida loweri =

Scientific classification
- Kingdom: Animalia
- Phylum: Arthropoda
- Class: Insecta
- Order: Coleoptera
- Suborder: Adephaga
- Family: Carabidae
- Genus: Demetrida
- Species: D. loweri

Binomial name
- Demetrida loweri (Blackburn, 1890)

Synonyms
- Xanthophaea loweri (Blackburn, 1890)

Species of beetle

Demetrida loweri is a species of ground beetle in the Lebiinae subfamily. It was described by Blackburn in 1890 and is found in Australia.
