= Eujalmenus =

Scientific classification
- Domain: Eukaryota
- Kingdom: Animalia
- Phylum: Arthropoda
- Class: Insecta
- Order: Coleoptera
- Suborder: Adephaga
- Family: Carabidae
- Subfamily: Lebiinae
- Tribe: Lebiini
- Subtribe: Agrina
- Genus: Eujalmenus; Bousquet, 2002

Synonyms
- Jalmenus Liebke, 1935

Genus of beetles

Eujalmenus is a genus in the ground beetle family Carabidae. There are at least four described species in Eujalmenus, found in Brazil.

== Species ==
These four species belong to the genus Eujalmenus:

- Eujalmenus auricolor (Liebke, 1935)
- Eujalmenus besckei (Liebke, 1939)
- Eujalmenus gounellei (Liebke, 1935)
- Eujalmenus purpuratus (Liebke, 1935)
