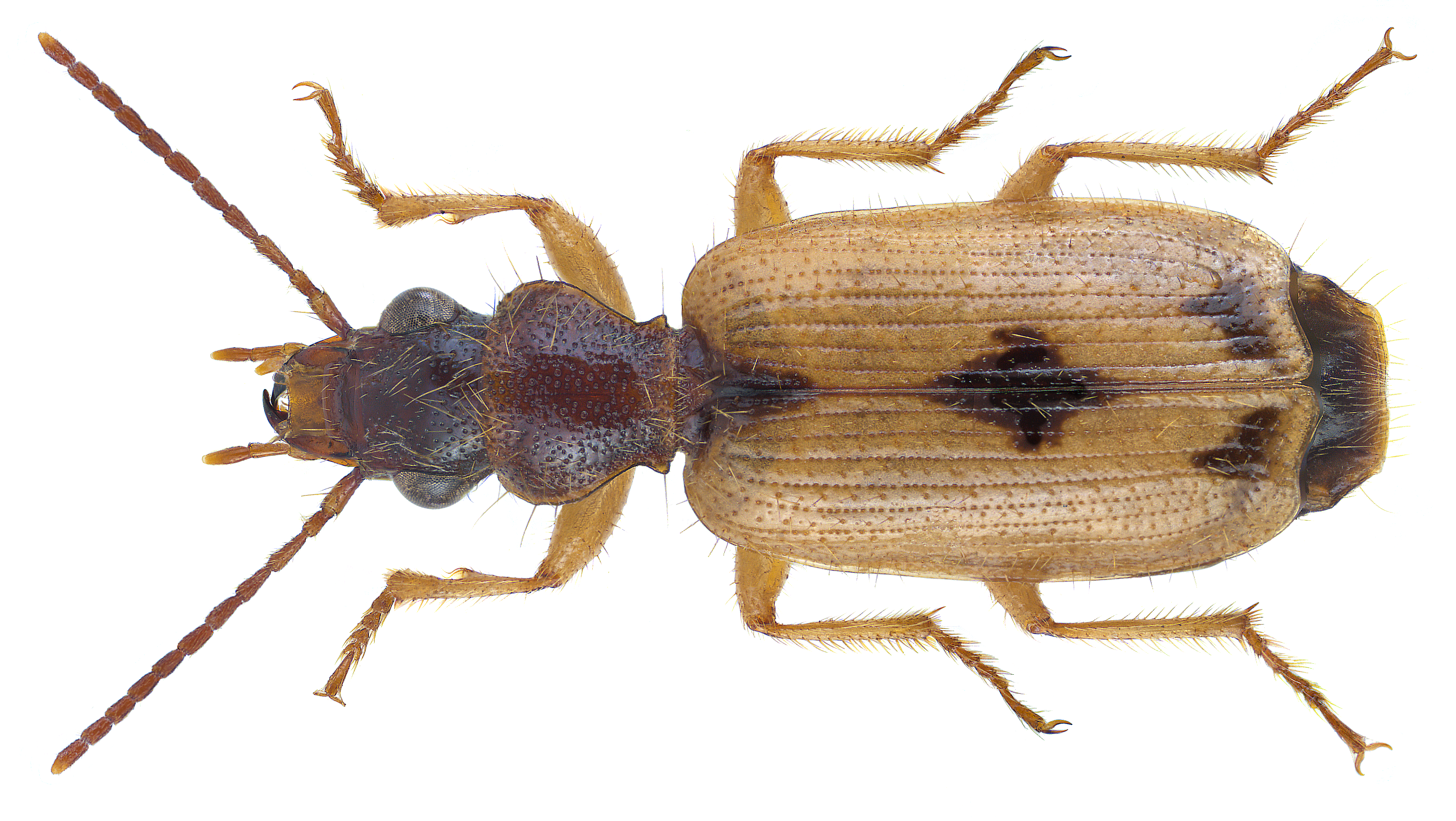
- Trichis maculata

Scientific classification
- Domain: Eukaryota
- Kingdom: Animalia
- Phylum: Arthropoda
- Class: Insecta
- Order: Coleoptera
- Suborder: Adephaga
- Family: Carabidae
- Subfamily: Lebiinae
- Tribe: Lebiini
- Subtribe: Trichina
- Genus: Trichis; Klug, 1832

= Trichis =

Genus of beetles

Trichis is a genus in the beetle family Carabidae. There are at least three described species in Trichis.

== Species ==
These three species belong to the genus Trichis:

- Trichis ceylonica (Ball & Hilchie, 1983) (Sri Lanka)
- Trichis maculata Klug, 1832
- Trichis pallida Klug, 1832
