= Sporades (beetle) =

Scientific classification
- Domain: Eukaryota
- Kingdom: Animalia
- Phylum: Arthropoda
- Class: Insecta
- Order: Coleoptera
- Suborder: Adephaga
- Family: Carabidae
- Subfamily: Trechinae
- Tribe: Trechini
- Genus: Sporades; Fauvel, 1882

Subgenera
- Perileptosporades Deuve, 2011; Sporades Fauvel, 1882

Genus of beetles

Sporades is a genus of ground beetles in the family Carabidae, first described by Charles Adolphe Albert Fauvel in 1882. There are about 12 described species in Sporades, found in New Caledonia.

== Species ==
These 12 species belong to the genus Sporades:

- Sporades beatricis Giachino, 2012
- Sporades daccordii Giachino, 2012
- Sporades jaechi Liebherr, 2020
- Sporades macrops Ueno, 1966
- Sporades millei Giachino, 2012
- Sporades modestior Deuve, 2011
- Sporades perileptoides Donabauer, 2011
- Sporades schuhi Donabauer, 2011
- Sporades sexpunctatus Fauvel, 1882
- Sporades tachysoides Deuve, 2011
- Sporades testaceus Ueno, 1966
- Sporades theryi Deuve, 2011
