= Pachycallida =

Scientific classification
- Domain: Eukaryota
- Kingdom: Animalia
- Phylum: Arthropoda
- Class: Insecta
- Order: Coleoptera
- Suborder: Adephaga
- Family: Carabidae
- Subfamily: Lebiinae
- Tribe: Lebiini
- Subtribe: Metallicina
- Genus: Pachycallida; Jeannel, 1949

Genus of beetles

Pachycallida is a genus in the ground beetle family Carabidae. There are at least three described species in Pachycallida.

== Species ==
These three species belong to the genus Pachycallida:

- Pachycallida amplicollis (Fairmaire, 1899) (Madagascar)
- Pachycallida rufoplagiata Jeannel, 1949 (Madagascar, Seychelles)
- Pachycallida sambiranensis Jeannel, 1949 (Madagascar)
