= Afrotarus =

Scientific classification
- Kingdom: Animalia
- Phylum: Arthropoda
- Clade: Pancrustacea
- Class: Insecta
- Order: Coleoptera
- Suborder: Adephaga
- Family: Carabidae
- Subfamily: Lebiinae
- Tribe: Lebiini
- Subtribe: Cymindidina
- Genus: Afrotarus; Jeannel, 1949

Synonyms
- Morphaeus Kirschenhofer, 1999

Genus of beetles

Afrotarus is a genus of ground beetles in the family Carabidae. There are about 10 described species in Afrotarus.

== Species ==
These 10 species belong to the genus Afrotarus:

- Afrotarus alluaudi Jeannel, 1949
- Afrotarus fadli Rasool; Felix; Abdel-Dayem & Aldhafer, 2017
- Afrotarus golanensis Kirschenhofer, 2010
- Afrotarus kilimanus (Kolbe, 1897)
- Afrotarus leleupi Basilewsky, 1962
- Afrotarus meruanus Basilewsky, 1962
- Afrotarus niger (Andrewes, 1935)
- Afrotarus raffrayi (Fairmaire, 1882)
- Afrotarus scotti (Basilewsky, 1948)
- Afrotarus soudaensis Rasool; Felix; Abdel-Dayem & Aldhafer, 2017
