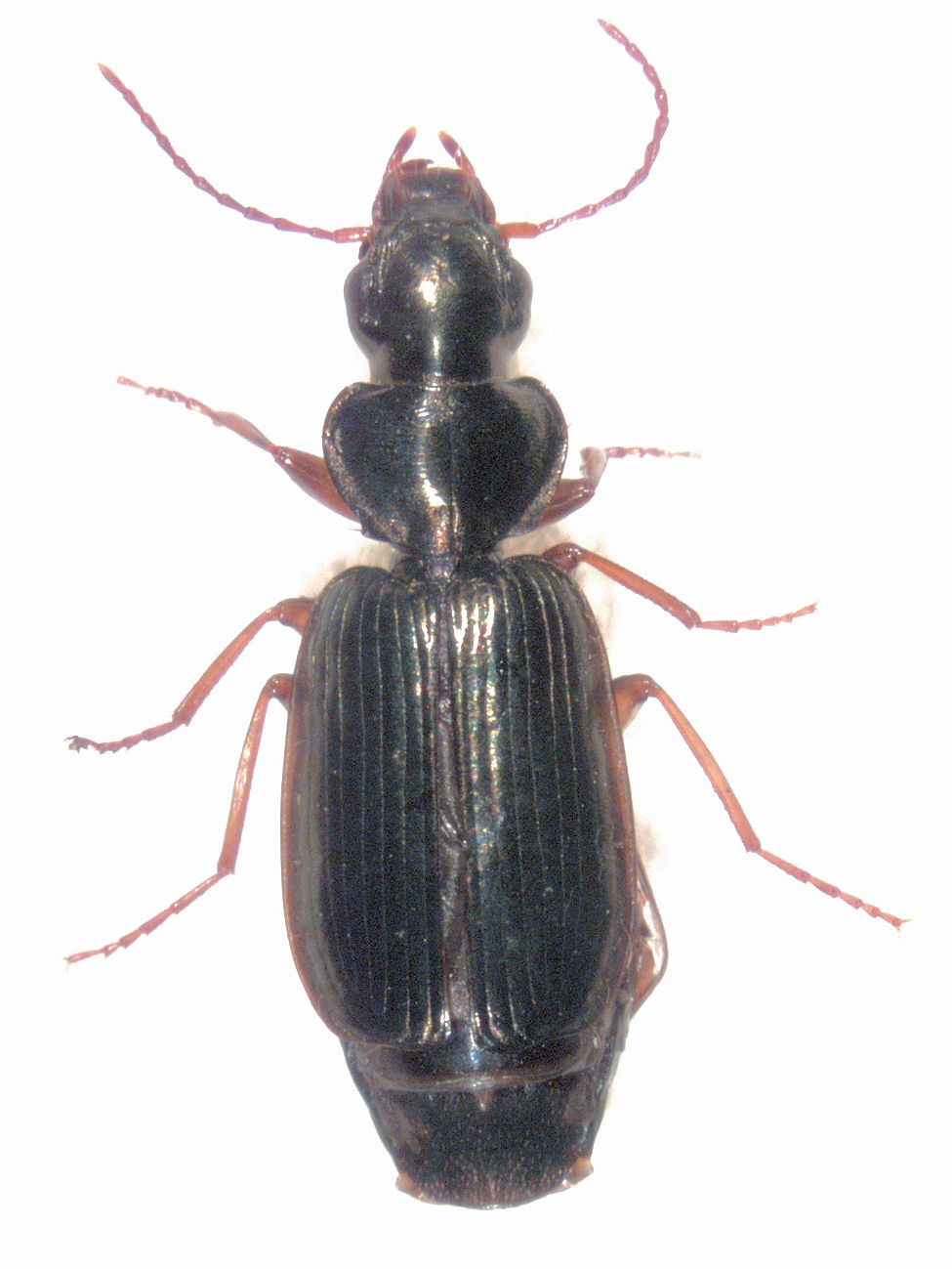
- adult Anomotarus illawarrae

Scientific classification
- Kingdom: Animalia
- Phylum: Arthropoda
- Class: Insecta
- Order: Coleoptera
- Suborder: Adephaga
- Family: Carabidae
- Subfamily: Lebiinae
- Genus: Anomotarus; Chaudoir, 1875

= Anomotarus =

Genus of beetles

Anomotarus is a genus of beetles in the family Carabidae, containing the following species:

- Anomotarus alpinus Baehr, 2005
- Anomotarus angusticollis (Sloane, 1915)
- Anomotarus apicalis Baehr, 2003
- Anomotarus assimilis Baehr, 2005
- Anomotarus atriceps Baehr, 2005
- Anomotarus australis (Chaudoir, 1875)
- Anomotarus bogani Baehr, 2005
- Anomotarus caerulescens (Blackburn, 1894)
- Anomotarus chaudoiri (Sloane, 1898)
- Anomotarus convexiusculus Baehr, 2005
- Anomotarus cordicollis Baehr, 2005
- Anomotarus cordifer Baehr, 2005
- Anomotarus crudelis (Newman, 1840)
- Anomotarus darlingtoni Baehr, 2003
- Anomotarus decoratus Andrewes, 1924
- Anomotarus discofoveatus Moore, 1985
- Anomotarus elliotti Baehr, 2005
- Anomotarus fasciatus Baehr, 2005
- Anomotarus flavocinctus Baehr, 2005
- Anomotarus flavus Baehr, 2003
- Anomotarus freyi (Moore, 1967)
- Anomotarus fulgens Baehr, 2005
- Anomotarus fuscipes Darlington, 1968
- Anomotarus geophilus (Montrouzier, 1860)
- Anomotarus gressitti Darlington, 1968
- Anomotarus humeralis Sloane, 1917
- Anomotarus humeratus Baehr, 2003
- Anomotarus illawarrae (W.J.Macleay, 1873)
- Anomotarus impictus Baehr, 2003
- Anomotarus interstitialis (Sloane, 1898)
- Anomotarus itoi Baehr, 2003
- Anomotarus jeanneli Mateu, 1972
- Anomotarus kosciuskoanus Baehr, 2005
- Anomotarus kununurrae Baehr, 2005
- Anomotarus lamingtonensis Baehr, 2005
- Anomotarus lamprus Baehr, 2003
- Anomotarus laticollis Baehr, 2005
- Anomotarus latiplaga Baehr, 2003
- Anomotarus leytensis Baehr, 2003
- Anomotarus macrops Baehr, 2003
- Anomotarus maculipennis (Mateu, 1970)
- Anomotarus magnicollis Baehr, 2003
- Anomotarus magnus (Moore, 1963)
- Anomotarus micans Baehr, 2005
- Anomotarus minor (Blackburn, 1889)
- Anomotarus minutus Baehr, 2005
- Anomotarus moluccarum Baehr, 2003
- Anomotarus monarensis Moore, 1986
- Anomotarus murrayanus Baehr, 2005
- Anomotarus mypongae Baehr, 2005
- Anomotarus nigrinus Baehr, 2005
- Anomotarus nitidior Baehr, 2005
- Anomotarus nubilus Baehr, 2005
- Anomotarus obsoletus Baehr, 2005
- Anomotarus occidentalis Baehr, 2005
- Anomotarus ocellatus Darlington, 1968
- Anomotarus opacus Baehr, 2003
- Anomotarus ornatellus Baehr, 2003
- Anomotarus ornatus Louwerens, 1956
- Anomotarus pakistanus (Jedlicka, 1964)
- Anomotarus pictulus (Bates, 1873)
- Anomotarus plagifer Darlington, 1968
- Anomotarus pseudogressitti Baehr, 2003
- Anomotarus puncticollis (Sloane, 1917)
- Anomotarus roberi Baehr, 2003
- Anomotarus rufescens Baehr, 2005
- Anomotarus ruficornis Sloane, 1917
- Anomotarus sambiranensis Mateu, 1972
- Anomotarus semisericeus Baehr, 2003
- Anomotarus sericus Andrewes, 1929
- Anomotarus stigmula (Chaudoir, 1852)
- Anomotarus subterraneus Moore, 1967
- Anomotarus timorensis Baehr, 2003
- Anomotarus transversus Darlington, 1968
- Anomotarus tumidiceps (Blackburn, 1889)
- Anomotarus umbratus (Blackburn, 1890)
- Anomotarus undurae Baehr, 2005
- Anomotarus unicolor Baehr, 1996
- Anomotarus unimaculatus (Blackburn, 1890)
- Anomotarus variegatus Moore, 1967
- Anomotarus vicinus Baehr, 2005
- Anomotarus violaceipennis Baehr, 2003
- Anomotarus vittipennis Baehr, 2003
- Anomotarus wallacei Darlington, 1968
- Anomotarus wegneri Louwerens, 1962
- Anomotarus wilcanniae Baehr, 2005
- Anomotarus wilsoni Baehr, 2005
