= Demetrida filiformis =

Scientific classification
- Kingdom: Animalia
- Phylum: Arthropoda
- Class: Insecta
- Order: Coleoptera
- Suborder: Adephaga
- Family: Carabidae
- Genus: Demetrida
- Species: D. filiformis

Binomial name
- Demetrida filiformis (Blackburn, 1893)

Synonyms
- Xanthophaea filiformis (Blackburn, 1893)

Species of beetle

Demetrida filiformis is a species of ground beetle in the Lebiinae subfamily. It was described by Blackburn in 1893 and is found in Australia.
