= Mormolycina =

Mormolycina obertheuri

Scientific classification
- Kingdom: Animalia
- Phylum: Arthropoda
- Class: Insecta
- Order: Coleoptera
- Suborder: Adephaga
- Family: Carabidae
- Subfamily: Lebiinae
- Genus: Mormolycina; Jeannel, 1949
- Species: M. obertheuri

Binomial name
- Mormolycina obertheuri (Fairmaire, 1889)

Genus of beetles

Mormolycina obertheuri is a species of beetle in the family Carabidae, the only species in the genus Mormolycina.
