= Titaresius =

Titaresius jeanneli

Scientific classification
- Kingdom: Animalia
- Phylum: Arthropoda
- Class: Insecta
- Order: Coleoptera
- Suborder: Adephaga
- Family: Carabidae
- Subfamily: Lebiinae
- Genus: Titaresius; Liebke, 1935
- Species: T. jeanneli

Binomial name
- Titaresius jeanneli Liebke, 1935

Genus of beetles

Titaresius jeanneli is a species of beetle in the family Carabidae, the only species in the genus Titaresius. It is found in Chile.
