= Pephrica =

Scientific classification
- Domain: Eukaryota
- Kingdom: Animalia
- Phylum: Arthropoda
- Class: Insecta
- Order: Coleoptera
- Suborder: Adephaga
- Family: Carabidae
- Subfamily: Lebiinae
- Tribe: Lebiini
- Subtribe: Somotrichina
- Genus: Pephrica; Alluaud, 1936

Genus of beetles

Pephrica is a genus in the ground beetle family Carabidae. There are about six described species in Pephrica.

== Species ==
These six species belong to the genus Pephrica:

- Pephrica aequatoria (Fairmaire, 1869) (Madagascar)
- Pephrica africana Mateu, 1963 (Kenya)
- Pephrica howa (Csiki, 1932) (Madagascar)
- Pephrica longefasciata Basilewsky, 1953 (Madagascar)
- Pephrica picea Basilewsky, 1953 (Madagascar)
- Pephrica trimaculata Alluaud, 1936 (Madagascar)
