= Demetrida brachinodera =

Scientific classification
- Kingdom: Animalia
- Phylum: Arthropoda
- Class: Insecta
- Order: Coleoptera
- Suborder: Adephaga
- Family: Carabidae
- Genus: Demetrida
- Species: D. brachinodera

Binomial name
- Demetrida brachinodera (Chaudoir, 1852)

Synonyms
- Demetrida pallida (Olliff, 1885)

Species of beetle

Demetrida brachinodera is a species of ground beetle in the Lebiinae subfamily. It was described by Chaudoir in 1852 and is endemic to Australia.
