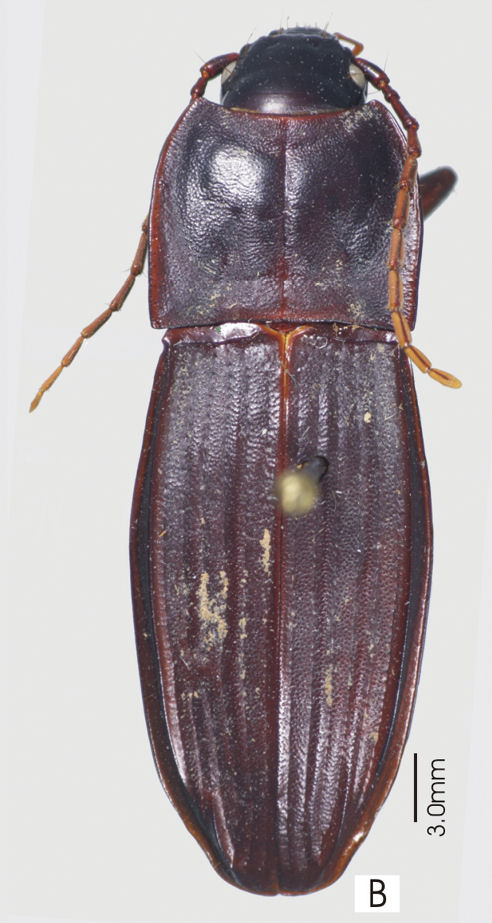
- Abacoleptus paradoxus

Scientific classification
- Kingdom: Animalia
- Phylum: Arthropoda
- Class: Insecta
- Order: Coleoptera
- Suborder: Adephaga
- Family: Carabidae
- Subfamily: Pterostichinae
- Genus: Abacoleptus; Fauvel, 1903

= Abacoleptus =

Genus of beetles

Abacoleptus is a genus of beetles in the family Carabidae, containing the following species: The genus was first described by Charles Adolphe Albert Fauvel in 1903.

- Abacoleptus carinatus Fauvel, 1903
- Abacoleptus curtus Will, 2011
- Abacoleptus paradoxus Heller, 1916
