= Demetrida parallela =

Scientific classification
- Kingdom: Animalia
- Phylum: Arthropoda
- Class: Insecta
- Order: Coleoptera
- Suborder: Adephaga
- Family: Carabidae
- Genus: Demetrida
- Species: D. parallela

Binomial name
- Demetrida parallela (Chaudoir, 1872)

Synonyms
- Demetrida ornata (Sloane, 1910)

Species of beetle

Demetrida parallela is a species of ground beetle in the Lebiinae subfamily. It was described by Chaudoir in 1872 and is endemic to Australia.
