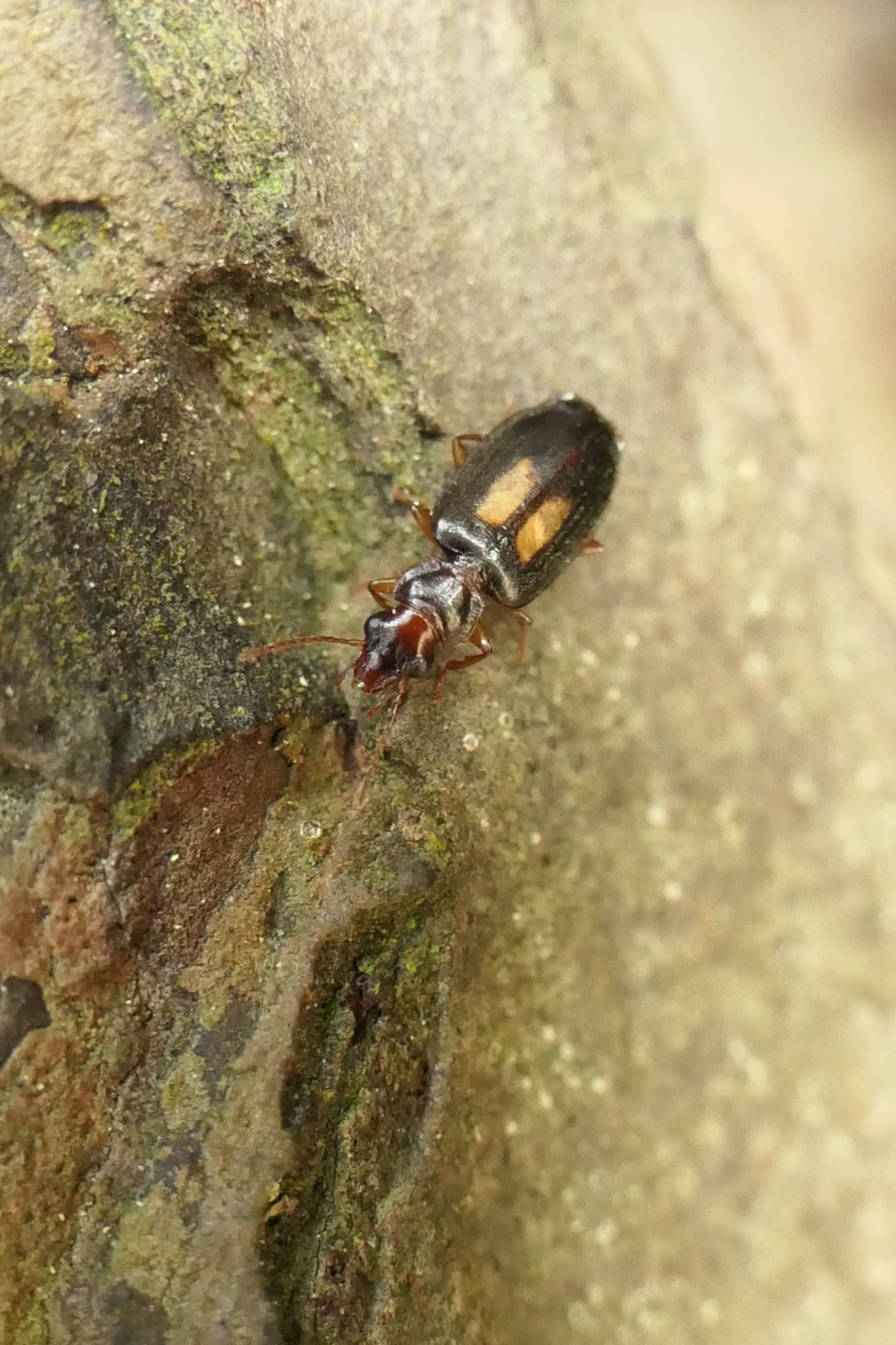
- Agonocheila antipodum, New Zealand

Scientific classification
- Kingdom: Animalia
- Phylum: Arthropoda
- Clade: Pancrustacea
- Class: Insecta
- Order: Coleoptera
- Suborder: Adephaga
- Family: Carabidae
- Subfamily: Lebiinae
- Tribe: Lebiini
- Subtribe: Pericalina
- Genus: Agonocheila; Chaudoir, 1848

= Agonocheila =

Genus of beetles

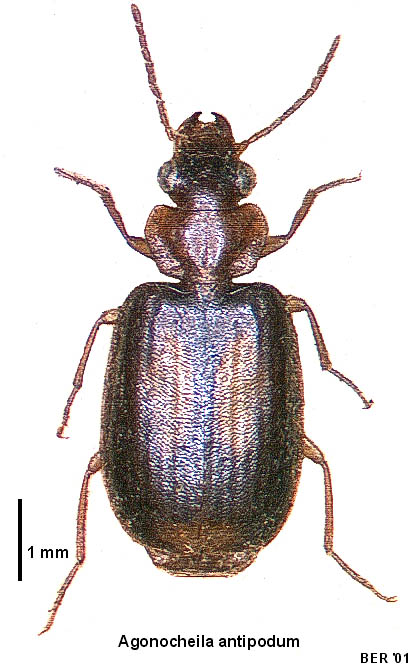
Agonocheila antipodum

Agonocheila is a genus in the beetle family Carabidae. There are more than 20 described species in Agonocheila.

== Species ==
These 28 species belong to the genus Agonocheila:

- Agonocheila anomala Chaudoir, 1870 (Australia)
- Agonocheila antipodum (Bates, 1867) (Australia and New Zealand)
- Agonocheila biguttata Chaudoir, 1870 (Australia)
- Agonocheila bimaculata Sloane, 1920 (Australia)
- Agonocheila chaudoiri Sloane, 1898 (Australia)
- Agonocheila cribripennis Chaudoir, 1870 (Australia)
- Agonocheila curtula (Erichson, 1842) (Australia)
- Agonocheila duplicata Darlington, 1968 (New Guinea)
- Agonocheila fasciata Sloane, 1898 (Australia)
- Agonocheila fenestrata Blackburn, 1892 (Australia)
- Agonocheila flindersi Sloane, 1920 (Australia)
- Agonocheila guttata Chaudoir, 1848 (Australia)
- Agonocheila irrita (Newman, 1842) (Australia)
- Agonocheila koebelei Blackburn, 1895 (Australia)
- Agonocheila lutosa (Newman, 1840) (Australia)
- Agonocheila macleayi Sloane, 1911 (Australia)
- Agonocheila mollis (Newman, 1842) (Australia)
- Agonocheila perplexa Blackburn, 1894 (Australia)
- Agonocheila plagiata Sloane, 1916 (Australia)
- Agonocheila punctulata Sloane, 1911 (Australia)
- Agonocheila quadricollis Sloane, 1911 (Australia)
- Agonocheila ruficollis Sloane, 1898 (Australia)
- Agonocheila signata B.Moore, 1963 (Australia)
- Agonocheila sinuosa Chaudoir, 1870 (Australia)
- Agonocheila subfasciata Chaudoir, 1870 (Australia)
- Agonocheila sublaevis Chaudoir, 1870 (Australia)
- Agonocheila suturalis W.J.MacLeay, 1871 (Australia)
- Agonocheila vittula Chaudoir, 1870 (Australia)
