= Demetrida lineata =

Scientific classification
- Kingdom: Animalia
- Phylum: Arthropoda
- Class: Insecta
- Order: Coleoptera
- Suborder: Adephaga
- Family: Carabidae
- Genus: Demetrida
- Species: D. lineata

Binomial name
- Demetrida lineata (Dejean, 1831)

Synonyms
- Demetrida plagiata (Germar, 1848), Lebia plagiata (Germar, 1848)

Species of beetle

Demetrida lineata is a species of ground beetle in the Lebiinae subfamily. It was described by Dejean in 1831 and is endemic to Australia.
