= Demetrida carteri =

Scientific classification
- Kingdom: Animalia
- Phylum: Arthropoda
- Class: Insecta
- Order: Coleoptera
- Suborder: Adephaga
- Family: Carabidae
- Genus: Demetrida
- Species: D. carteri

Binomial name
- Demetrida carteri (Sloane, 1923)

Synonyms
- Xanthophaea carteri (Sloane, 1923)

Species of beetle

Demetrida carteri is a species of ground beetle in the Lebiinae subfamily. It was described by Sloane in 1923 and is endemic to Australia.
