= Pseudotmesisternus =

Scientific classification
- Kingdom: Animalia
- Phylum: Arthropoda
- Class: Insecta
- Order: Coleoptera
- Suborder: Polyphaga
- Infraorder: Cucujiformia
- Family: Cerambycidae
- Genus: Pseudotmesisternus
- Species: P. vestitus

Binomial name
- Pseudotmesisternus vestitus (Fauvel, 1906)

Synonyms
- Tmesisternus vestitus Fauvel, 1906; Tmesisternus vestitus Breuning, 1945; Pseudotmesisternus vestitus Breuning, 1951 (Sudre et al., 2010)

Genus of beetles

Pseudotmesisternus vestitus is a species of beetle in the family Cerambycidae, and the only species in the genus Pseudotmesisternus. It was described by Fauvel in 1906.
