= Cylindropectus =

Scientific classification
- Domain: Eukaryota
- Kingdom: Animalia
- Phylum: Arthropoda
- Class: Insecta
- Order: Coleoptera
- Suborder: Adephaga
- Family: Carabidae
- Subfamily: Lebiinae
- Tribe: Lebiini
- Subtribe: Pericalina
- Genus: Cylindropectus; Lorenz, 1998

Genus of beetles

Cylindropectus is a genus in the ground beetle family Carabidae. There are at least two described species in Cylindropectus, found in Africa.

== Species ==
These two species belong to the genus Cylindropectus:

- Cylindropectus cyaneus Mateu, 1974 (Ivory Coast, Cameroon)
- Cylindropectus griseus Mateu, 1974 (Cameroon, DR Congo)
