= Demetrida moesta =

Scientific classification
- Kingdom: Animalia
- Phylum: Arthropoda
- Class: Insecta
- Order: Coleoptera
- Suborder: Adephaga
- Family: Carabidae
- Genus: Demetrida
- Species: D. moesta

Binomial name
- Demetrida moesta Sharp, 1878

Subspecies
- Demetrida (Demetrida) moesta atra Broun, 1880; Demetrida (Demetrida) moesta moesta Sharp, 1878

Species of beetle

Demetrida moesta is a species of ground beetle in the Lebiinae subfamily. It was described by Sharp in 1878 and is endemic to New Zealand.
