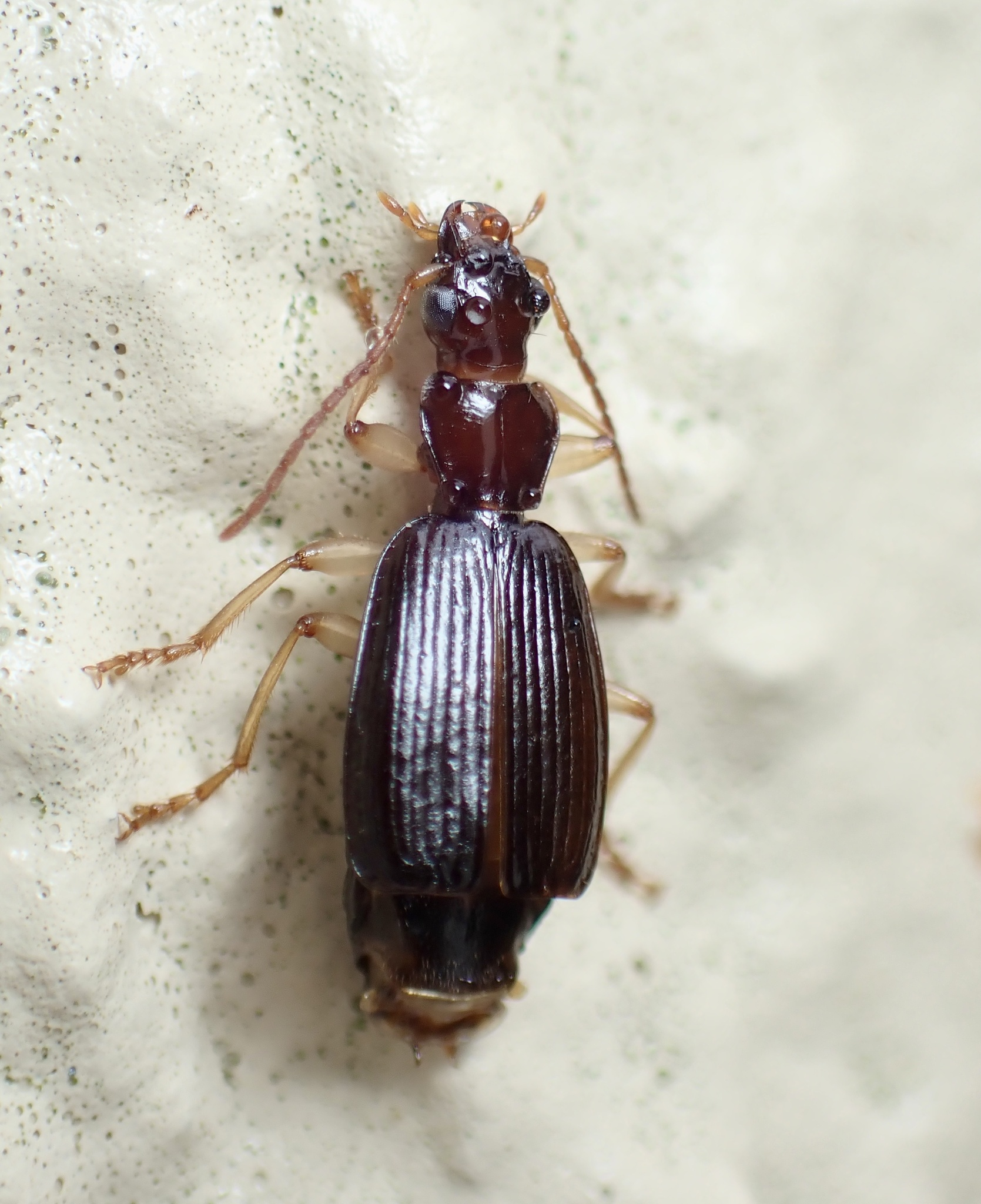
- Adult D. diffenbachii, Banks Peninsula, New Zealand

Scientific classification
- Kingdom: Animalia
- Phylum: Arthropoda
- Class: Insecta
- Order: Coleoptera
- Suborder: Adephaga
- Family: Carabidae
- Genus: Demetrida
- Species: D. dieffenbachii

Binomial name
- Demetrida dieffenbachii (White, 1843)

Synonyms
- Cymindis dieffenbachii White, 1843; Cymindis australis Blanchard, 1842; Demetrida australis (Blanchard, 1842); Demetrida picea (Chaudoir, 1848)

= Demetrida dieffenbachii =

Species of beetle

Demetrida dieffenbachii is a species of ground beetle in the Lebiinae subfamily. It was described by Adam White in 1843. It is endemic to New Zealand.
