= Sinurus =

Scientific classification
- Domain: Eukaryota
- Kingdom: Animalia
- Phylum: Arthropoda
- Class: Insecta
- Order: Coleoptera
- Suborder: Adephaga
- Family: Carabidae
- Subfamily: Lebiinae
- Tribe: Lebiini
- Subtribe: Pericalina
- Genus: Sinurus; Chaudoir, 1870

Genus of beetles

Sinurus is a genus in the ground beetle family Carabidae. There are at least three described species in Sinurus.

== Species ==
These three species belong to the genus Sinurus:

- Sinurus graciliceps Bates, 1892 (Nepal, India, Myanmar)
- Sinurus nitidus Bates, 1892 (Myanmar)
- Sinurus opacus Chaudoir, 1870 (India, Myanmar, Malaysia, Indonesia, Borneo, Philippines, New Guinea)
