= Chaudoirina =

Scientific classification
- Kingdom: Animalia
- Phylum: Arthropoda
- Class: Insecta
- Order: Coleoptera
- Suborder: Adephaga
- Family: Carabidae
- Subfamily: Lebiinae
- Genus: Chaudoirina; Mateu, 1954

Genus of beetles

Chaudoirina is a genus of beetles in the family Carabidae, containing the following species:

- Chaudoirina nigrofasciata (Solier, 1849)
- Chaudoirina orfilai (Mateu, 1954)
- Chaudoirina vianai (Liebke, 1939)
