= Leptosarcus =

Scientific classification
- Kingdom: Animalia
- Phylum: Arthropoda
- Class: Insecta
- Order: Coleoptera
- Suborder: Adephaga
- Family: Carabidae
- Subfamily: Lebiinae
- Tribe: Lebiini
- Subtribe: Cymindidina
- Genus: Leptosarcus; Péringuey, 1896

Genus of beetles

Leptosarcus is a genus in the ground beetle family Carabidae. There are at least two described species in Leptosarcus, found in South Africa.

== Species ==
These two species belong to the genus Leptosarcus:

- Leptosarcus hessei Basilewsky, 1954
- Leptosarcus porrectus (Péringuey, 1892)
