= Afrodromius =

Afrodromius indotatus

Scientific classification
- Kingdom: Animalia
- Phylum: Arthropoda
- Class: Insecta
- Order: Coleoptera
- Suborder: Adephaga
- Family: Carabidae
- Subfamily: Lebiinae
- Genus: Afrodromius; Basilewsky, 1958
- Species: A. indotatus

Binomial name
- Afrodromius indotatus (Peringuey, 1904)

Genus of beetles

Afrodromius indotatus is a species of beetle in the family Carabidae, the only species in the genus Afrodromius.
