= Demetrida concinna =

Scientific classification
- Kingdom: Animalia
- Phylum: Arthropoda
- Class: Insecta
- Order: Coleoptera
- Suborder: Adephaga
- Family: Carabidae
- Genus: Demetrida
- Species: D. concinna

Binomial name
- Demetrida concinna (Blackburn, 1901)

Synonyms
- Xanthophaea concinna (Blackburn, 1901)

Species of beetle

Demetrida concinna is a species of ground beetle in Lebiinae subfamily. It was described by Blackburn in 1901 and is found in Australia.
