= Demetrida chaudoiri =

Scientific classification
- Kingdom: Animalia
- Phylum: Arthropoda
- Class: Insecta
- Order: Coleoptera
- Suborder: Adephaga
- Family: Carabidae
- Genus: Demetrida
- Species: D. chaudoiri

Binomial name
- Demetrida chaudoiri (W. J. Macleay, 1871)

Synonyms
- Xanthophaea chaudoiri (W. J. Macleay, 1871)

Species of beetle

Demetrida chaudoiri is a species of ground beetle in the subfamily Lebiinae. It was described by William John Macleay in 1871 and is found in Australia.
