= Kteatus =

Scientific classification
- Domain: Eukaryota
- Kingdom: Animalia
- Phylum: Arthropoda
- Class: Insecta
- Order: Coleoptera
- Suborder: Adephaga
- Family: Carabidae
- Subfamily: Lebiinae
- Tribe: Lebiini
- Subtribe: Agrina
- Genus: Kteatus; Liebke, 1936
- Species: K. bruchi

Binomial name
- Kteatus bruchi Liebke, 1936

Synonyms
- Cteatus Liebke, 1939

Genus of beetles

Kteatus is a genus of ground beetles in the family Carabidae. This genus has a single species, Kteatus bruchi, found in Argentina.
