= Velindastus =

Velindastus discrepans

Scientific classification
- Kingdom: Animalia
- Phylum: Arthropoda
- Class: Insecta
- Order: Coleoptera
- Suborder: Adephaga
- Family: Carabidae
- Subfamily: Lebiinae
- Genus: Velindastus; Schule & Lorenz, 2008
- Species: V. discrepans

Binomial name
- Velindastus discrepans Schule & Lorenz, 2008

Genus of beetles

Velindastus discrepans is a species of beetle in the family Carabidae, the only species in the genus Velindastus.
