= Thyreochaetus =

Thyreochaetus hirsutus

Scientific classification
- Kingdom: Animalia
- Phylum: Arthropoda
- Clade: Pancrustacea
- Class: Insecta
- Order: Coleoptera
- Suborder: Adephaga
- Family: Carabidae
- Subfamily: Lebiinae
- Genus: Thyreochaetus; Basilewsky, 1959
- Species: T. hirsutus

Binomial name
- Thyreochaetus hirsutus Basilewsky, 1959

Genus of beetles

Thyreochaetus hirsutus is a species of beetle in the family Carabidae. It is the only species in the genus Thyreochaetus.
