= Pseudomonnea =

Scientific classification
- Domain: Eukaryota
- Kingdom: Animalia
- Phylum: Arthropoda
- Class: Insecta
- Order: Coleoptera
- Suborder: Adephaga
- Family: Carabidae
- Subfamily: Lebiinae
- Tribe: Lebiini
- Subtribe: Dromiusina
- Genus: Pseudomonnea; Mateu, 1983

Genus of beetles

Pseudomonnea is a genus in the ground beetle family Carabidae. There are at least three described species in Pseudomonnea, found in South America.

== Species ==
These three species belong to the genus Pseudomonnea:

- Pseudomonnea grandis Mateu, 1983 (Brazil)
- Pseudomonnea maculata Mateu, 1983 (Argentina)
- Pseudomonnea nigrescens Mateu, 1983 (Bolivia)
