= Demetrida nigricincta =

Scientific classification
- Kingdom: Animalia
- Phylum: Arthropoda
- Class: Insecta
- Order: Coleoptera
- Suborder: Adephaga
- Family: Carabidae
- Genus: Demetrida
- Species: D. nigricincta

Binomial name
- Demetrida nigricincta (Sloane, 1910)

Synonyms
- Xanthophaea nigricincta (Sloane, 1910)

Species of beetle

Demetrida nigricincta is a species of ground beetle in the Lebiinae subfamily. It was described by Sloane in 1910 and is endemic to Australia.
