= Demetrida grandis =

Scientific classification
- Kingdom: Animalia
- Phylum: Arthropoda
- Class: Insecta
- Order: Coleoptera
- Suborder: Adephaga
- Family: Carabidae
- Genus: Demetrida
- Species: D. grandis

Binomial name
- Demetrida grandis (Chaudoir, 1848)

Synonyms
- Xanthophaea grandis (Chaudoir, 1848)

Species of beetle

Demetrida grandis is a species of ground beetle in the Lebiinae subfamily. It was described by Chaudoir in 1848 and is endemic to Australia.
