= Assadecma =

Scientific classification
- Domain: Eukaryota
- Kingdom: Animalia
- Phylum: Arthropoda
- Class: Insecta
- Order: Coleoptera
- Suborder: Adephaga
- Family: Carabidae
- Subfamily: Lebiinae
- Tribe: Lebiini
- Subtribe: Cymindidina
- Genus: Assadecma; Basilewsky, 1982

Genus of beetles

Assadecma is a genus in the beetle family Carabidae. There are at least two described species in Assadecma, found in Madagascar.

== Species ==
These two species belong to the genus Assadecma:

- Assadecma basilewskyi Kavanaugh & Rainio, 2016 (Madagascar)
- Assadecma madagascariensis Basilewsky, 1982 (Madagascar)
