= Benoît-Philibert Perroud =

French entomologist

Benoit-Philibert Perroud (1796 Lyon -1887, Lyon), was a French entomologist.

Benoit-Philibert Perroud was a specialist in Coleoptera. He was a Member of the Société entomologique de France, the Société Linnéenne de Lyon and the Entomological Society of Stettin.

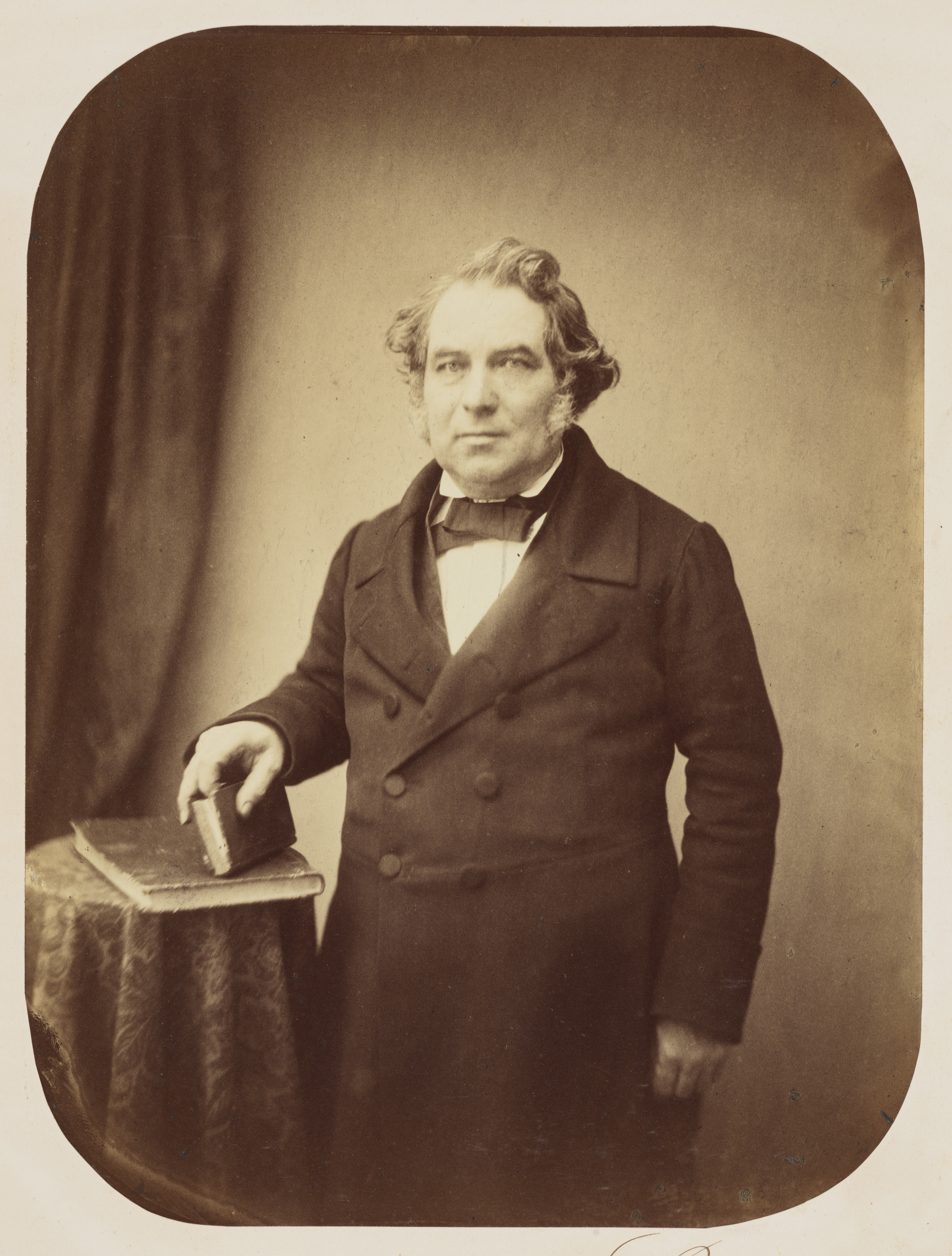
Portrait photographique de Benoît-Philibert Perroud

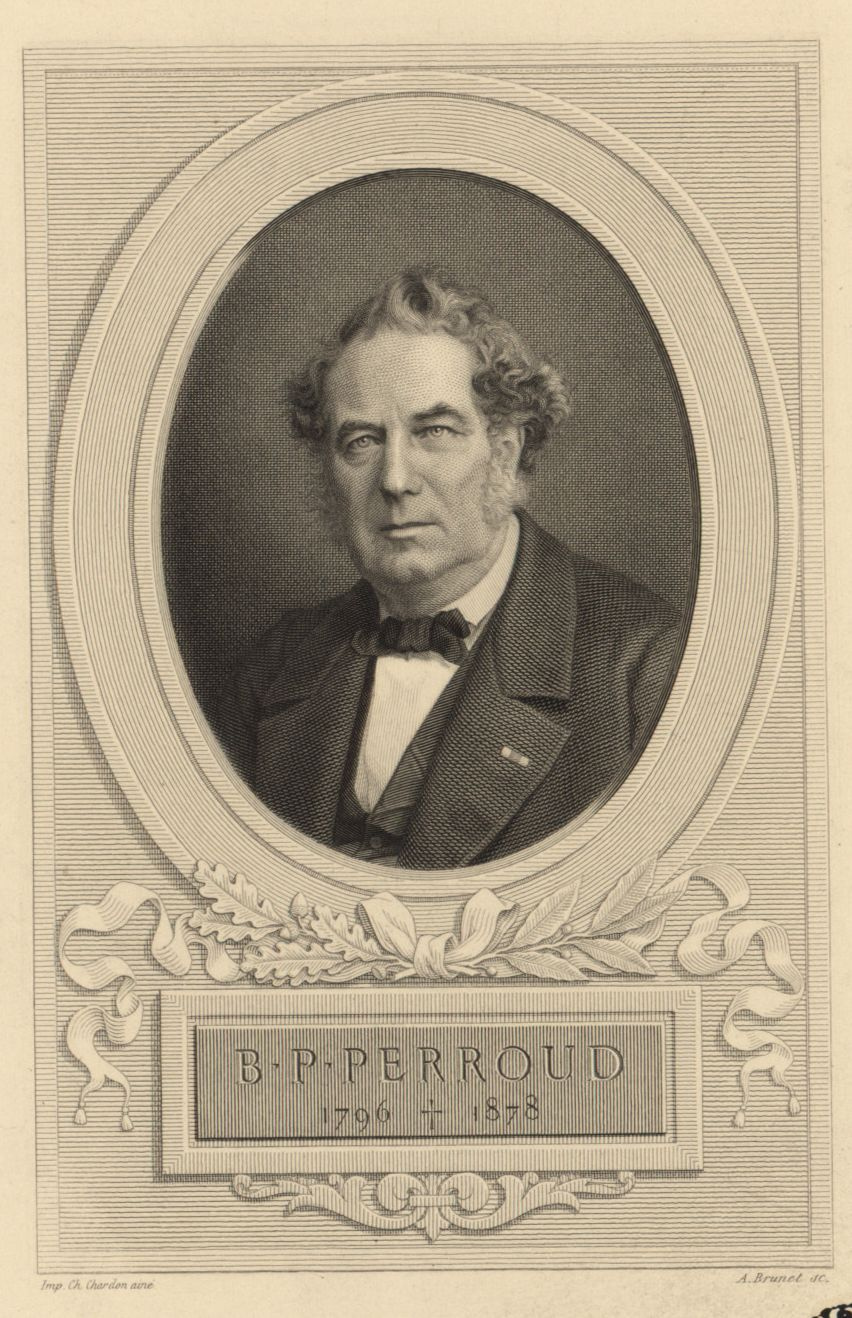
Portrait gravé de Benoît-Philibert Perroud

== Works ==
partial list

- Perroud, B. P. 1855. Description de quelques espèces nouvelles ou peu connus et création de quelques nouveaux genres dans la famille des longicornes. Annales de la Societé Linneene de Lyon (2)2:327-401.
- Perroud, B.-P. and Montrousier, P [Reverendus Pater]. 1864: Essai sur la faune entomologique de Kanala (Nouvelle Calédonie) et descriptions de quelques espèces nouvelles ou peu connues. Annales de la Société Linnéenne de Lyon, 11: 46-257.
