= Albert Fauvel =

French entomologist

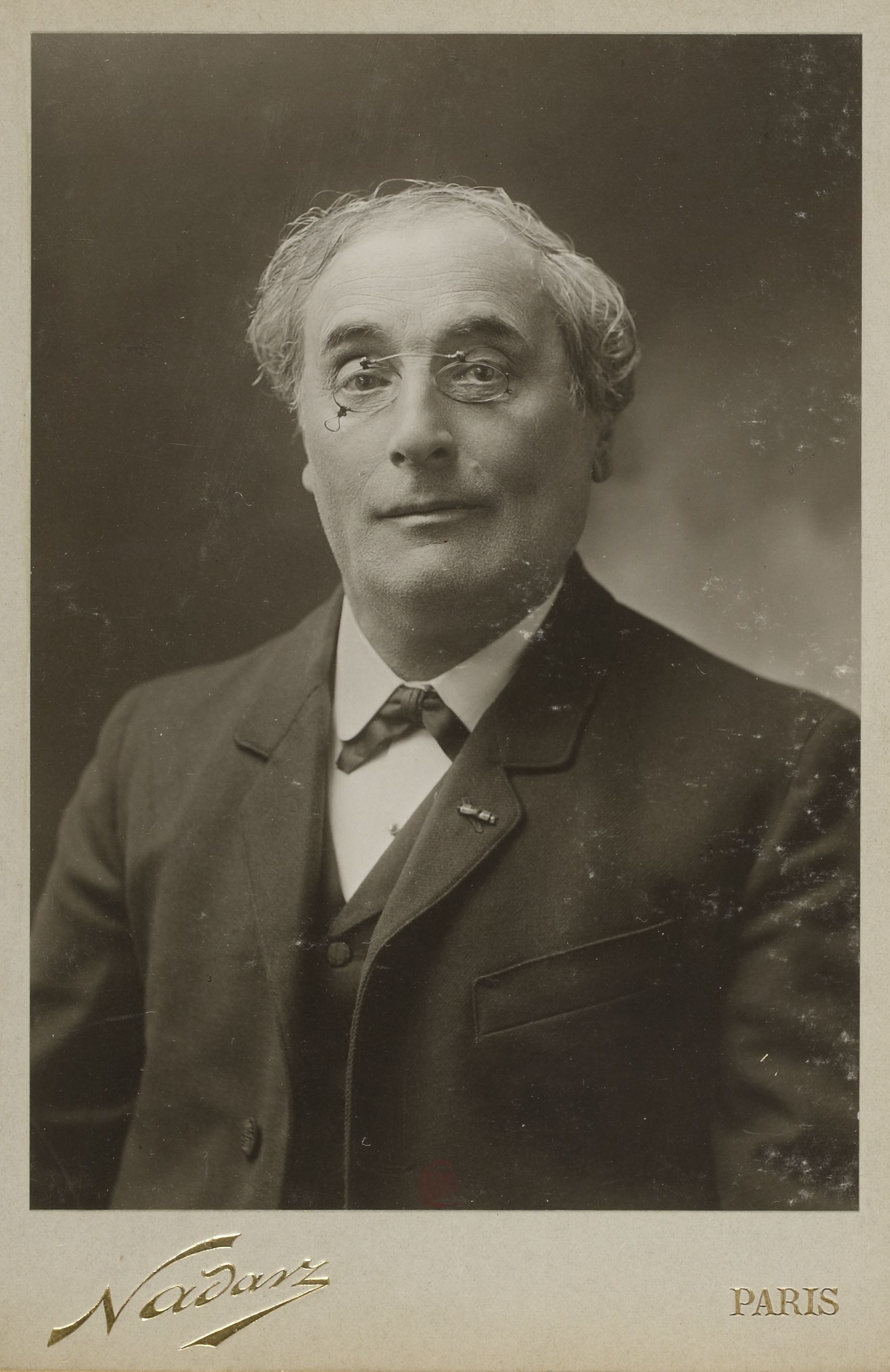

Charles Adolphe Albert Fauvel (1840, Caen -1921), better known as Albert Fauvel, was a French lawyer and amateur entomologist who specialised in Coleoptera. He described and named 1,851 species and 96 genera in Staphylinidae. He wrote nearly 250 papers in the Revue d’ Entomologie, a journal he founded, and a multi-volume work, Faune gallo-rhénane. For unknown reasons, he abruptly stopped publishing in 1910 and became a recluse for the rest of his life. His insect collections are held by the Royal Belgian Institute of Natural Sciences in Brussels, the Natural History Museum of Bern, Switzerland and the Museo Civico di Storia Naturale di Genova, Italy.

His zoological author abbreviation is Fauvel.
