= P. Jackson Darlington Jr. =

American zoologist (1904–1983)

- Born: November 14, 1904; Philadelphia, Pennsylvania, US
- Died: December 16, 1983 (aged 79); Cambridge, Massachusetts, US

Academic background
- Education: Harvard University

Academic work
- Discipline: entomology; zoology
- Institutions: Harvard University; Harvard Museum of Comparative Zoology
- Military career
- Branch: United States Army
- Rank: major

Philip Jackson Darlington Jr. (November 14, 1904 – December 16, 1983) was an American entomologist, field naturalist, biogeographer, museum curator and zoology professor, known for his toughness and determination on field expeditions.

== Biography ==
Darlington graduated in 1922 from secondary school at Phillips Exeter Academy and then attended Harvard University, where he graduated with bachelor's degree in 1926 and M.S. in 1927. In the 1920s he went on several field expeditions to the West Indies. From 1928 to 1929 he worked as an entomologist for the United Fruit Company near Santa Marta, Colombia. He returned to graduate study at Harvard University with an extensive collection of insects and vertebrates, including a diversity of bird skins, which formed the basis for a 1931 article. He received in 1931 his Ph.D. from Harvard University with a thesis on the Carabidae (ground beetles) of New Hampshire. From 1931 to 1932 he was a member of the Harvard Australian Expedition (1931–1932) led by William Morton Wheeler (his thesis advisor) and returned with a collection of a huge number of insects and 341 mammals.

Darlington was a key member of the six-man Harvard Australian Expedition (1931-1932) sent on behalf of the Harvard Museum of Comparative Zoology (MCZ) for the dual purpose of procuring specimens - the museum being "weak in Australian animals and ... desires[ing] to complete its series" - and to engage in "the study of the animals of the region when alive." The mission was success with over 300 mammal and thousands of insect specimens returning to the United States. His companion William E. Schevill reported that "Dr. Darlington's resourceful skill and industry had brought together, from New South Wales and Queensland, not only a large collection of insects, but also over three hundred fifty mammals, representing over sixty species, as well about fifty species of birds; in addition, he had about two hundred fifty reptiles and amphibians."

Following his return from the expedition, Darlington was made the MCZ's assistant curator of insects from 1932 to 1940, from 1940 to 1951 the Henry Clinton Fall Curator of Coleoptera, and from 1951 until his retirement in 1971 the Curator of Insects. He was also at Harvard University from 1962 until his retirement in 1971 the Alexander Agassiz Professor of Zoology.

Upon the entry of the United States into World War II, Darlington enlisted as a Sanitary Corps entomologist with the rank of first lieutenant in the United States Army Medical Service Corps. He served in the Sixth United States Army during Operation Cartwheel and subsequent campaigns before retiring as a major in April 1944. Before he departed from New Guinea, he was able to collect many specimens of ground beetles and other insects.

In 1942, Darlington married Elizabeth Koch, who later accompanied on many of his field expeditions. The couple and their son, Philip Frederick Darlington, spent eighteen months in 1956–1957 for a field study, camping from a truck in the Australian outback.

== Scientific fame ==
Darlington presented a theory challenging William Diller Matthew's 1915 theory of faunal dominance.

Darlington's most important contribution to science was his theory of the Old World tropical origin of dominant vertebrate groups. He first sketched out this formulation—which would influence research in zoogeography for a generation—in The Quarterly Review of Biology of 1948, then presented it in full dress in his 1957 text, Zoogeography: The Geographical Distribution of Animals.

== Crocodile episode ==
During a wartimefield survey for malarial mosquito larvae in New Guinea, Darlington was sampling stagnant water. Collecting alone in the jungle, he ventured into a stagnant pool by stepping carefully onto a submerged log, but a full-grown crocodile swam up and attacked him. Although seized in the crocodile's jaws, he kicked the crocodile away, escaped and scrambled back to land. With serious blood loss, torn muscles and ligaments in both arms, broken bones in his right arm and piercing wounds in both hands, he hiked back to the U.S. army hospital.

With characteristic understatement, Darlington wrote to his wife of "an episode with a crocodile" but supplied no further details. He was in a cast for several months, convalescing at Dobodura, Papua, where he perfected a left-handed technique for collecting insects: Have someone tie a vial to the end of a stick. Walk out into the forest, jam the stick into the ground, pull the cork out with the left hand, drop the specimens into the vial, replace the cork. He eventually regained full use of his hands and arms.

== Frog drop experiment ==
Thomas Barbour was the director of Harvard's Museum of Comparative Zoology from 1927 to 1946. For many years, Barbour and Darlington had friendly arguments about Barbour's advocacy of faunal dispersion by land bridges versus Darlington's advocacy of extreme-wind-borne dispersal of small animals over isolated islands. To test his ideas, Darlington dropped several live frogs from a window on the fifth floor of the Museum. Barbour and a crowd of spectators observed the experiment. The dropped frogs were stunned and remained still for a few seconds, but almost immediately they started to recover and in a few minutes were hopping normally.

== Awards and honors ==
- 1947 — Guggenheim Fellowship for the academic year 1947–1948
- 1956 — Guggenheim Fellowship for the academic year 1956–1957
- 1957 — Daniel Giraud Elliot Medal
- 1962 — elected a Fellow of the American Academy of Arts and Sciences
- 1964 — elected a Member of the United States National Academy of Sciences

== Legacy ==
Darlington is commemorated in the scientific names of four species of lizards: Anolis darlingtoni, Celestus darlingtoni, Sphaerodactylus darlingtoni and Sphenomorphus darlingtoni.
