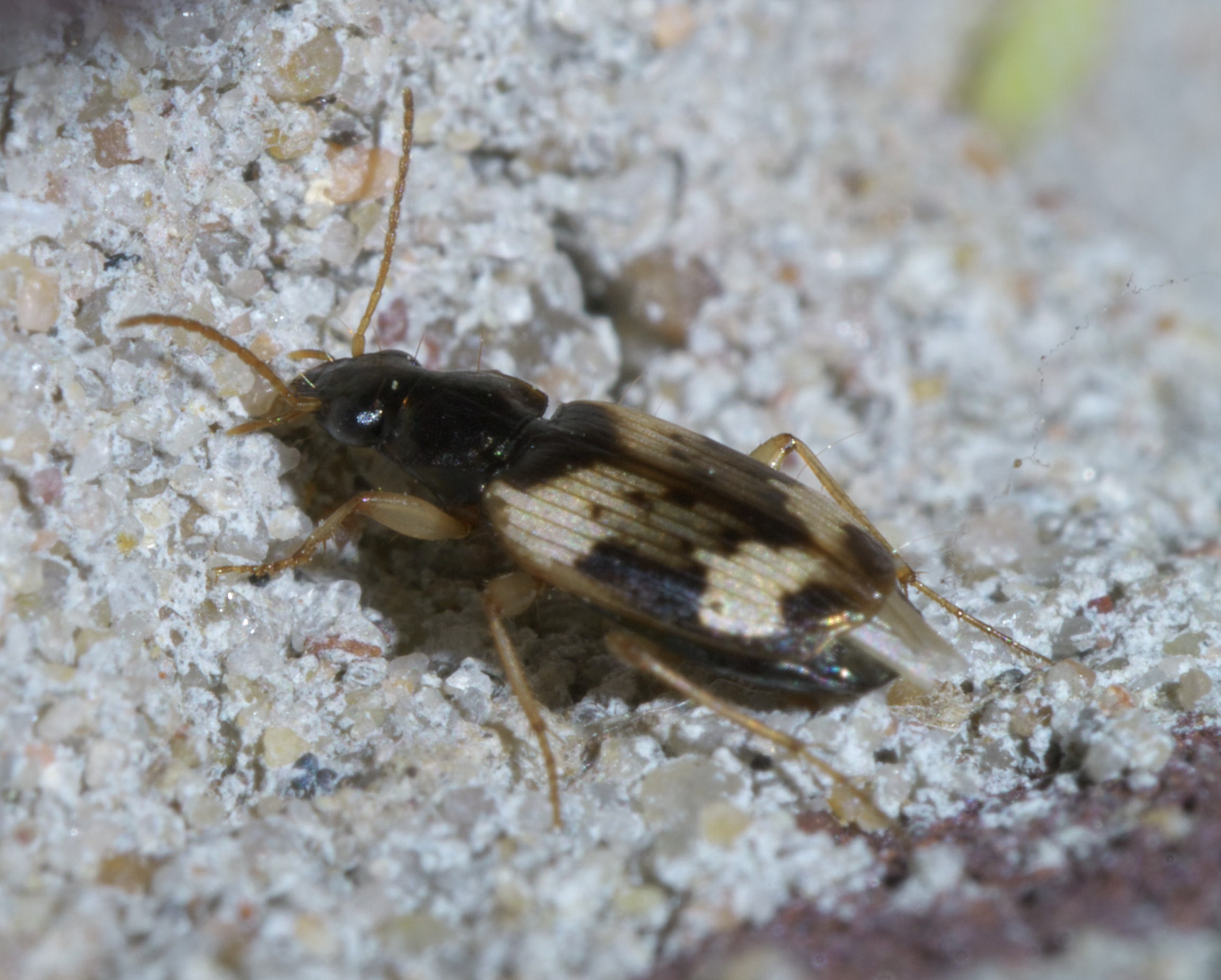
- Tetragonoderus, Oklahoma

Scientific classification
- Domain: Eukaryota
- Kingdom: Animalia
- Phylum: Arthropoda
- Class: Insecta
- Order: Coleoptera
- Suborder: Adephaga
- Family: Carabidae
- Subfamily: Lebiinae; Bonelli, 1810

= Lebiinae =

Subfamily of beetles

Lebiinae is a subfamily of ground beetles in the family Carabidae. There are more than 330 genera and 6,300 described species in Lebiinae, in 5 tribes.

== Lebiinae tribes ==
Cyclosomini Laporte, 1834
Lachnophorini LeConte, 1853
Lebiini Bonelli, 1810
Odacanthini Laporte, 1834
Perigonini G.Horn, 1881
