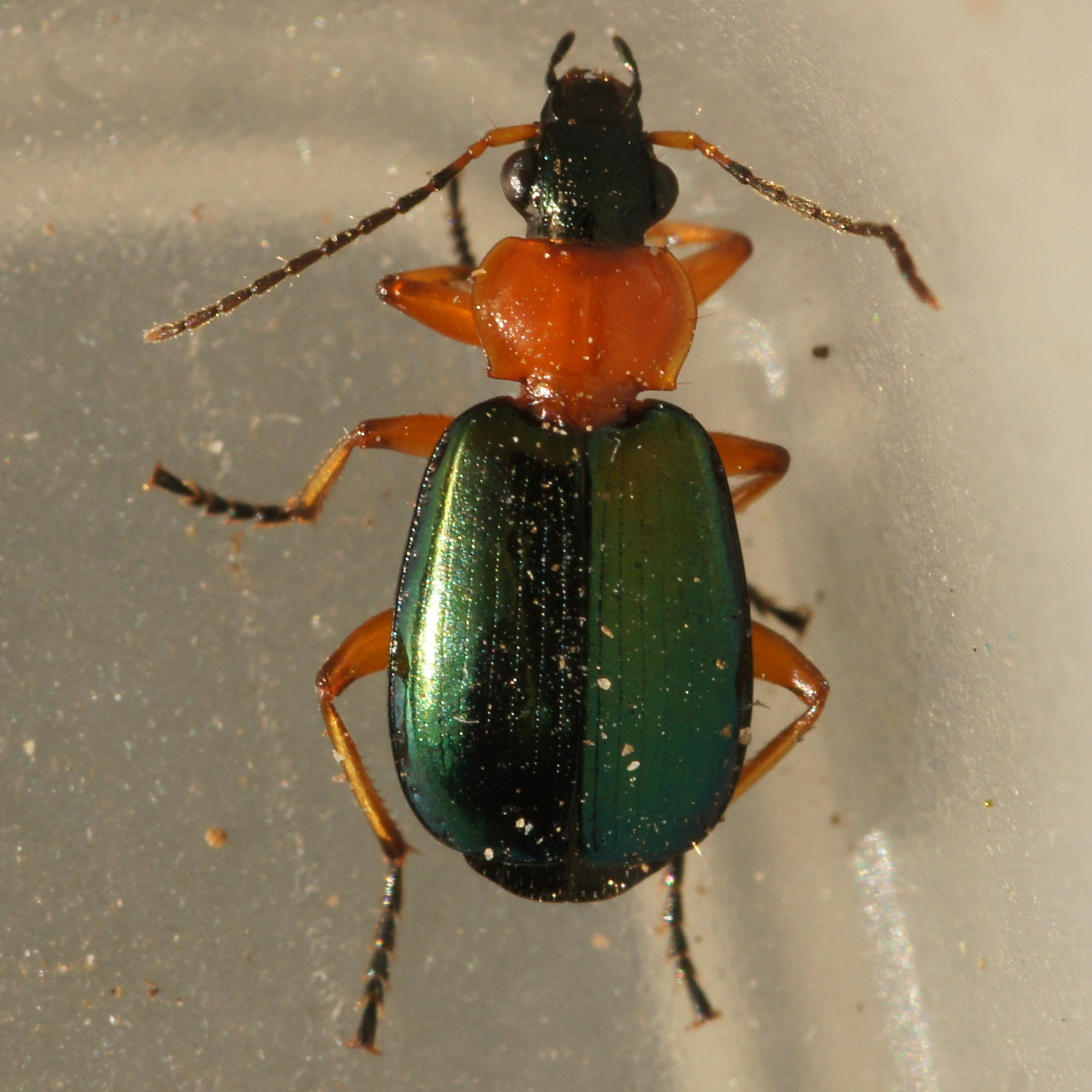
- Lebia chlorocephala

Scientific classification
- Kingdom: Animalia
- Phylum: Arthropoda
- Class: Insecta
- Order: Coleoptera
- Suborder: Adephaga
- Family: Carabidae
- Subfamily: Lebiinae
- Tribe: Lebiini; Bonelli, 1810

= Lebiini =

Tribe of beetles

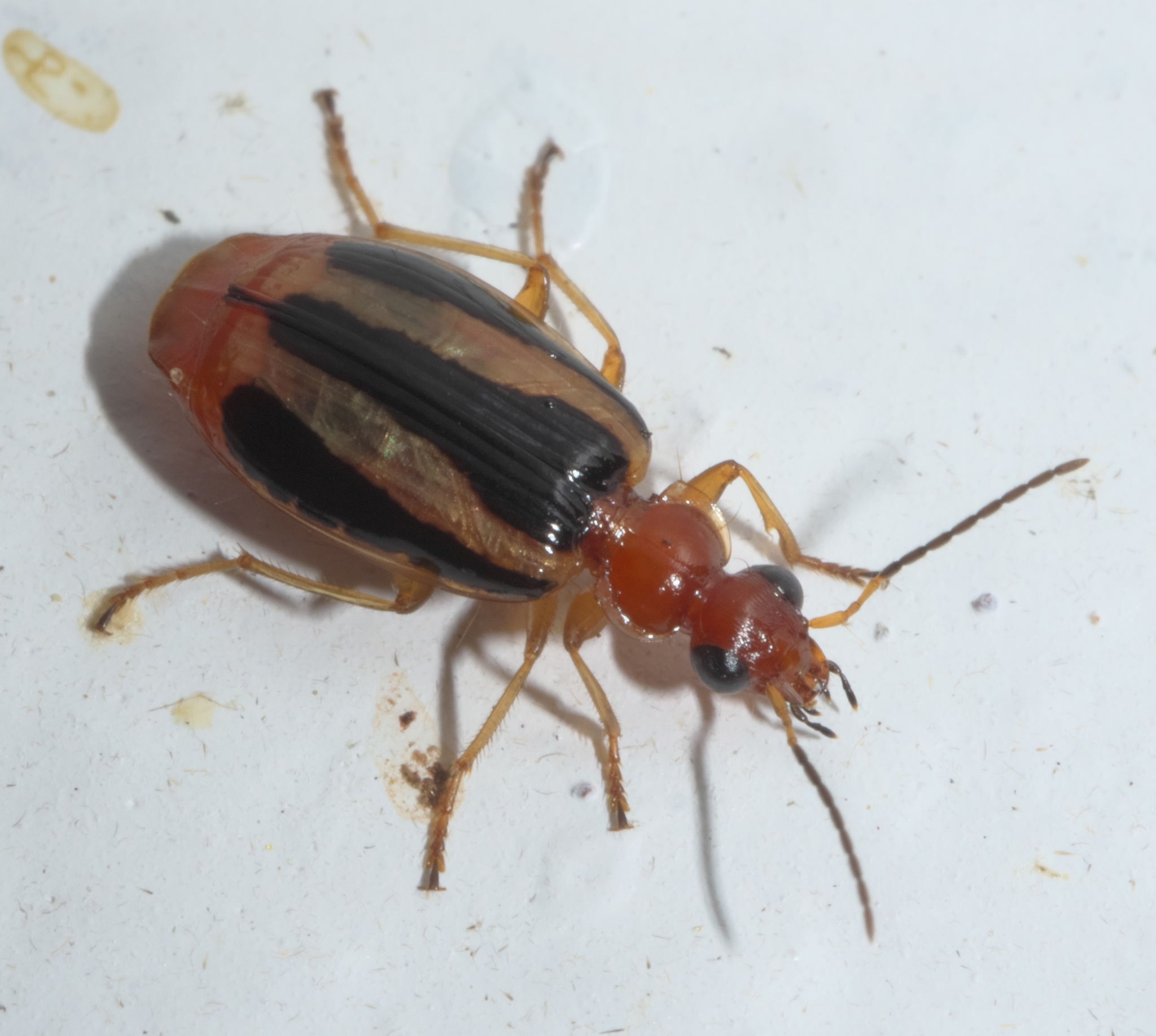
Lebia solea, Oklahoma

Lebiini is a tribe of ground beetles in the family Carabidae. There are more than 250 genera and 4,800 described species in Lebiini.

== Genera ==
These 251 genera belong to the tribe Lebiini:

Subtribe Agrina Kirby, 1837
Abaditicus Ball & Hilchie, 1983
Abrodiella Bousquet, 2002
Agra Fabricius, 1801
Allardina Basilewsky, 1963
Amelus Chaudoir, 1873
Anomotariella Baehr, 2012
Anomotarus Chaudoir, 1875
Apterodromites Mateu, 1976
Aspasiola Chaudoir, 1877
Calleida Latreille, 1824
Calleidomorpha Motschulsky, 1855
Callidadelpha Steinheil, 1875
Chaudoirina Mateu, 1955
Cryptobatis Eschscholtz, 1829
Cyanotarus Reed, 1874
Cylindronotum Putzeys, 1845
Demetrida White, 1846
Diabaticus Bates, 1878
Do Baehr, 2009
Dromidea Perroud & Montrouzier, 1864
Epikastea Liebke, 1935
Eujalmenus Bousquet, 2002
Euplatia Chaudoir, 1873
Eurycalleida Maindron, 1905
Falsodromius Mateu, 1976
Glycia Chaudoir, 1842
Hyboptera Chaudoir, 1873
Hybopteroides Erwin & Ball, 2012
Infernophilus Larson, 1969
Kteatus Liebke, 1936
Lipostratia Chaudoir, 1873
Merizomena Chaudoir, 1873
Mimodromius Chaudoir, 1873
Mimophilorhizus Mateu, 1993
Oechalius Liebke, 1935
Ogygium Liebke, 1935
Onota Chaudoir, 1873
Otoglossa Chaudoir, 1873
Paraglycia Bedel, 1904
Phacocerus Chaudoir, 1873
Philophuga Motschulsky, 1859
Phloeocarabus W.J.MacLeay, 1871
Plochionus Dejean, 1821
Pontonoa Liebke, 1935
Pseudotoglossa Mateu, 1961
Pylartesius Liebke, 1939
Rugitarus Baehr, 2009
Speotarus B.Moore, 1964
Straneotia Mateu, 1961
Tecnophilus Chaudoir, 1877
Teiresia Liebke, 1935
Thoasia Liebke, 1939
Titaresius Liebke, 1935
Trigonothops W.J.MacLeay, 1864
Valeriaaschero Erwin, 2004
Vianasia Mateu, 1955
Subtribe Apenina Ball
Apenes LeConte, 1851
Cymindoidea Laporte, 1833
Habutarus Ball & Hilchie, 1983
Platytarus Fairmaire, 1850
Trymosternus Chaudoir, 1873
Subtribe Celaenephina Habu, 1982
Celaenephes Schmidt-Goebel, 1846
Subtribe Cymindidina Laporte, 1834
Afrotarus Jeannel, 1949
Assadecma Basilewsky, 1982
Cymindis Latreille, 1805
Hystrichopus Boheman, 1848
Leptosarcus Péringuey, 1896
Metaxymorphus Chaudoir, 1850
Petrimagnia Kryzhanovskij & Mikhailov, 1971
Pinacodera Schaum, 1857
Plagiopyga Boheman, 1848
Pseudomasoreus Desbrochers des Loges, 1904
Taridius Chaudoir, 1875
Subtribe Demetriadina Bates, 1886
Cylindrocranius Chaudoir, 1878
Demetrias Bonelli, 1810
Subtribe Dromiusina Bonelli, 1810
Afrodromius Basilewsky, 1958
Axinopalpus LeConte, 1846
Barrymooreana Baehr, 1997
Brachynopterus Bedel, 1898
Brigalowia Baehr, 2006
Calodromius Reitter, 1905
Carbonellia Mateu, 1968
Disciferella Kataev & Muilwijk, 2020
Dromiops Péringuey, 1898
Dromius Bonelli, 1810
Dromoceryx Schmidt-Goebel, 1846
Geoffreyella Baehr, 2012
Klepteromimus Péringuey, 1898
Mesolestes Schatzmayr, 1943
Metadromius Bedel, 1907
Microdaccus Schaum in Baudi di Selve, 1864
Microlestes Schmidt-Goebel, 1846
Microlestodes Baehr, 1987
Monnea Mateu, 1970
Negrea Mateu, 1968
Omophagus Andrewes, 1937
Oxoides Solier, 1849
Paradromius Fowler, 1887
Philorhizus Hope, 1838
Polyaulacus Chaudoir, 1878
Psammodromius Peyerimhoff, 1927
Pseudomonnea Mateu, 1983
Somalodromius Mateu, 1967
Xenodromius Bates, 1891
Zolotarevskyella Mateu, 1953
Subtribe Gallerucidiina Chaudoir, 1872
Gallerucidia Chaudoir, 1872
Lebidia A.Morawitz, 1862
Subtribe Lebiina Bonelli, 1810
Alkestis Liebke, 1939
Aristolebia Bates, 1892
Daer Semenov & Znojko, 1929
Lachnolebia Maindron, 1905
Lebia Latreille, 1802
Lebidema Motschulsky, 1864
Lebiomorphica Lorenz, 1998
Lebistina Motschulsky, 1864
Lebistinida Péringuey, 1898
Lionedya Chaudoir, 1871
Matabele Péringuey, 1896
Megalebia Mateu, 1972
Orthobasis Chaudoir, 1871
Pachylebia Jeannel, 1949
Pachylebiodes Mateu, 1972
Paulianolebia Mateu, 1972
Pseudopachylebia Mateu, 1972
Rhopalostyla Chaudoir, 1850
Scalidion Schmidt-Goebel, 1846
Setolebia Jedlicka, 1941
Sofota Jedlicka, 1951
Subtribe Lichnasthenina J.Thomson
Astastus Péringuey, 1896
Australovelinda Baehr, 2012
Imasakaia Arai & Morita, 2010
Lichnasthenus J.Thomson, 1858
Mimovelindopsis Mateu, 1963
Velinda Andrewes, 1921
Velindastus Schüle & Lorenz, 2008
Velindomimus Jeannel, 1955
Velindopsis Burgeon, 1937
Subtribe Lionychina Jeannel, 1948
Apristomimus Mateu, 1969
Apristus Chaudoir, 1846
Eremolestes Maindron, 1905
Lionychus Wissmann, 1846
Lorestania Anichtchenko, 2011
Metablus Jedlicka, 1958
Omobrus Andrewes, 1930
Singiliomimus Péringuey, 1896
Syntomus Hope, 1838
Tilius Chaudoir, 1876
Trichidema Basilewsky, 1956
Subtribe Metallicina Basilewsky, 1984
Euproctinus Leng & Mutchler, 1927
Metallica Chaudoir, 1873
Pachycallida Jeannel, 1949
Parena Motschulsky, 1860
Subtribe Peliocypadina Basilewsky, 1984
Demetriola Jeannel, 1949
Peliocypas Schmidt-Goebel, 1846
Subtribe Pericalina Hope, 1838
Agonocheila Chaudoir, 1848
Allophanes Andrewes, 1939
Allophanopsis Louwerens, 1952
Amphimenes Bates, 1873
Amphimenoides Kirschenhofer, 1999
Antimerina Alluaud, 1897
Arsinoe Laporte, 1834
Auchmerus Andrewes, 1929
Bellavalentis Hunting & Yang, 2019
Brachichila Chaudoir, 1870
Brachyctis Chaudoir, 1870
Catascopellus Straneo, 1969
Catascopus Kirby, 1825
Cheilagona Baehr, 2006
Coptodera Dejean, 1825
Coptoglossus Chaudoir, 1870
Coptoptera Chaudoir, 1837
Coptopterella Basilewsky, 1961
Coptopterina Basilewsky, 1956
Crassagena Baehr, 2006
Cylindropectus Lorenz, 1998
Dolichoctis Schmidt-Goebel, 1846
Dontolobus Basilewsky, 1970
Drymatus Motschulsky, 1862
Eucheila Dejean, 1829
Eurycoleus Chaudoir, 1848
Eurydera Laporte, 1831
Formosiella Jedlicka, 1951
Gidda Andrewes, 1920
Glyphodactyla Chaudoir, 1837
Holcoderus Chaudoir, 1870
Horniulus Jedlicka, 1932
Labocephalus Chaudoir, 1848
Lelis Chaudoir, 1870
Lioptera Chaudoir, 1870
Lobodontidius Basilewsky, 1970
Lobodontulus Basilewsky, 1970
Lobodontus Chaudoir, 1842
Madecassina Jeannel, 1949
Mascarenhia Alluaud, 1933
Menarus Andrewes, 1939
Metascopus Basilewsky, 1970
Minuphloeus Darlington, 1968
Minuthodes Andrewes, 1941
Miscelus Klug, 1834
Mochtherus Schmidt-Goebel, 1846
Mormolyce Hagenbach, 1825
Mormolycina Jeannel, 1949
Neocoptodera Jeannel, 1949
Nycteis Laporte, 1835
Oreodicastes Maindron, 1905
Oxyodontus Chaudoir, 1870
Paradolichoctis Baehr, 2006
Pareurydera Jeannel, 1949
Pectinitarsus Fairmaire, 1881
Pericalus W.S.MacLeay, 1825
Philophlaeus Chaudoir, 1844
Phloeoxena Chaudoir, 1870
Pristacrus Chaudoir, 1870
Pseudoplatiella Baehr, 2012
Serrimargo Chaudoir, 1870
Sfitakantha Andrewes, 1919
Sinurus Chaudoir, 1870
Stenognathus Chaudoir, 1843
Stenotelus Bouchard, 1903
Stilboma Andrewes, 1933
Stricklandiana Bousquet, 2002
Tantillus Chaudoir, 1870
Thyreochaetus Basilewsky, 1959
Thyreopterus Dejean, 1831
Thysanotus Chaudoir, 1848
Trichocoptodera Louwerens, 1958
Xanthos Kirschenhofer, 2003
Xenitenopsis Basilewsky, 1956
Xenitenus Péringuey, 1896
Subtribe Physoderina Chaudoir, 1877
Allocota Motschulsky, 1860
Anchista Nietner, 1856
Dasiosoma Britton, 1937
Diamella Shi & Liang, 2013
Endynomena Chaudoir, 1873
Lachnoderma W.J.MacLeay, 1873
Metallanchista Shi & Liang, 2013
Orionella Jedlicka, 1964
Paraphaea Bates, 1873
Physodera Eschscholtz, 1829
Subtribe Pseudotrechina Basilewsky, 1984
Pseudotrechus Rosenhauer, 1856
Subtribe Singilina Jeannel, 1949
Singilis Rambur, 1837
Subtribe Somotrichina Mateu, 1963
Oecornis Britton, 1940
Paulianites Jeannel, 1949
Pephrica Alluaud, 1936
Somotrichus Seidlitz, 1887
Subtribe Sugimotoina Habu, 1975
Sugimotoa Habu, 1975
Subtribe Trichina Basilewsky, 1984
Trichis Klug, 1832
Not assigned to a subtribe
†Cymindoides Motschulsky, 1856
†Lebina Germar, 1813
†Miolebidia Zhang; Liu & Shangguan, 1989
†Protoscalidion L.Schaufuss, 1888
