= Dromiops =

Scientific classification
- Kingdom: Animalia
- Phylum: Arthropoda
- Class: Insecta
- Order: Coleoptera
- Suborder: Adephaga
- Family: Carabidae
- Subfamily: Lebiinae
- Tribe: Lebiini
- Subtribe: Dromiusina
- Genus: Dromiops; Péringuey, 1898
- Species: D. nanniscus

Binomial name
- Dromiops nanniscus (Péringuey, 1898)

Genus of beetles

Dromiops is a genus in the ground beetle family Carabidae. This genus has a single species, Dromiops nanniscus. It is found in Zimbabwe and South Africa.
