= Pachylebia =

Scientific classification
- Domain: Eukaryota
- Kingdom: Animalia
- Phylum: Arthropoda
- Class: Insecta
- Order: Coleoptera
- Suborder: Adephaga
- Family: Carabidae
- Tribe: Lebiini
- Subtribe: Lebiina
- Genus: Pachylebia; Jeannel, 1949
- Species: P. pallipes

Binomial name
- Pachylebia pallipes Jeannel, 1949

Genus of beetles

Pachylebia is a genus in the ground beetle family Carabidae. This genus has a single species, Pachylebia pallipes. It is found in Madagascar.
