= Microlestodes =

Scientific classification
- Domain: Eukaryota
- Kingdom: Animalia
- Phylum: Arthropoda
- Class: Insecta
- Order: Coleoptera
- Suborder: Adephaga
- Family: Carabidae
- Subfamily: Lebiinae
- Tribe: Lebiini
- Subtribe: Dromiusina
- Genus: Microlestodes; Baehr, 1987

Subgenera
- Cyclolestodes Baehr, 1987; Microlestodes Baehr, 1987

Genus of beetles

Microlestodes is a genus in the beetle family Carabidae. There are about 16 described species in Microlestodes.

== Species ==
These 16 species belong to the genus Microlestodes:

- Microlestodes arnhemensis Baehr, 2010 (Australia)
- Microlestodes atrifasciatus (Sloane, 1910) (Australia)
- Microlestodes australiensis (Sloane, 1900) (Australia)
- Microlestodes cinctus (Darlington, 1968) (New Guinea)
- Microlestodes flavicornis Baehr, 1987 (Australia)
- Microlestodes ibiscae Baehr, 2009 (Australia)
- Microlestodes inoculatus Baehr, 1987 (Australia)
- Microlestodes macleayi (Csiki, 1932) (Australia)
- Microlestodes marcidus (Blackburn, 1903) (Australia)
- Microlestodes occidentalis Baehr, 1990 (Australia)
- Microlestodes ovatus Baehr, 1987 (Australia)
- Microlestodes parallelus Baehr, 1987 (Australia)
- Microlestodes pseudohumeralis Baehr, 1987 (Australia)
- Microlestodes rufoniger Baehr, 1987 (Australia)
- Microlestodes yarrae (Blackburn, 1892) (Australia)
- Microlestodes zonatus Baehr, 1987 (Australia)
