= Neocoptodera =

Scientific classification
- Domain: Eukaryota
- Kingdom: Animalia
- Phylum: Arthropoda
- Class: Insecta
- Order: Coleoptera
- Suborder: Adephaga
- Family: Carabidae
- Subfamily: Lebiinae
- Tribe: Lebiini
- Subtribe: Pericalina
- Genus: Neocoptodera; Jeannel, 1949

Subgenera
- Coptodrella Hansen, 1968; Neocoptodera Jeannel, 1949; Nycteoschema Jeannel, 1949; Paranycteis Jeannel, 1949

Genus of beetles

Neocoptodera is a genus in the beetle family Carabidae. There are about 13 described species in Neocoptodera, found in Africa.

== Species ==
These 13 species belong to the genus Neocoptodera:

- Neocoptodera alluaudi (Jeannel, 1949) (Madagascar)
- Neocoptodera championi (Murray, 1857) (Africa)
- Neocoptodera crassicornis (Fairmaire, 1897) (Madagascar)
- Neocoptodera crucifera (Dejean, 1831) (Africa)
- Neocoptodera hanseni Facchini, 2011 (Democratic Republic of the Congo)
- Neocoptodera inermis (Alluaud, 1897) (Madagascar)
- Neocoptodera notata (Boheman, 1848) (Africa)
- Neocoptodera overlaeti (Burgeon, 1937) (Democratic Republic of the Congo and Angola)
- Neocoptodera rotundimaculata Facchini, 2011 (Tanzania)
- Neocoptodera similata (Hansen, 1968) (Africa)
- Neocoptodera tetraspilota (Fairmaire, 1887) (Madagascar)
- Neocoptodera tetrastigma (Fairmaire, 1901) (Madagascar)
- Neocoptodera uelensis (Burgeon, 1937) (Cameroon, Congo (Brazzaville), and Democratic Republic of the Congo)
