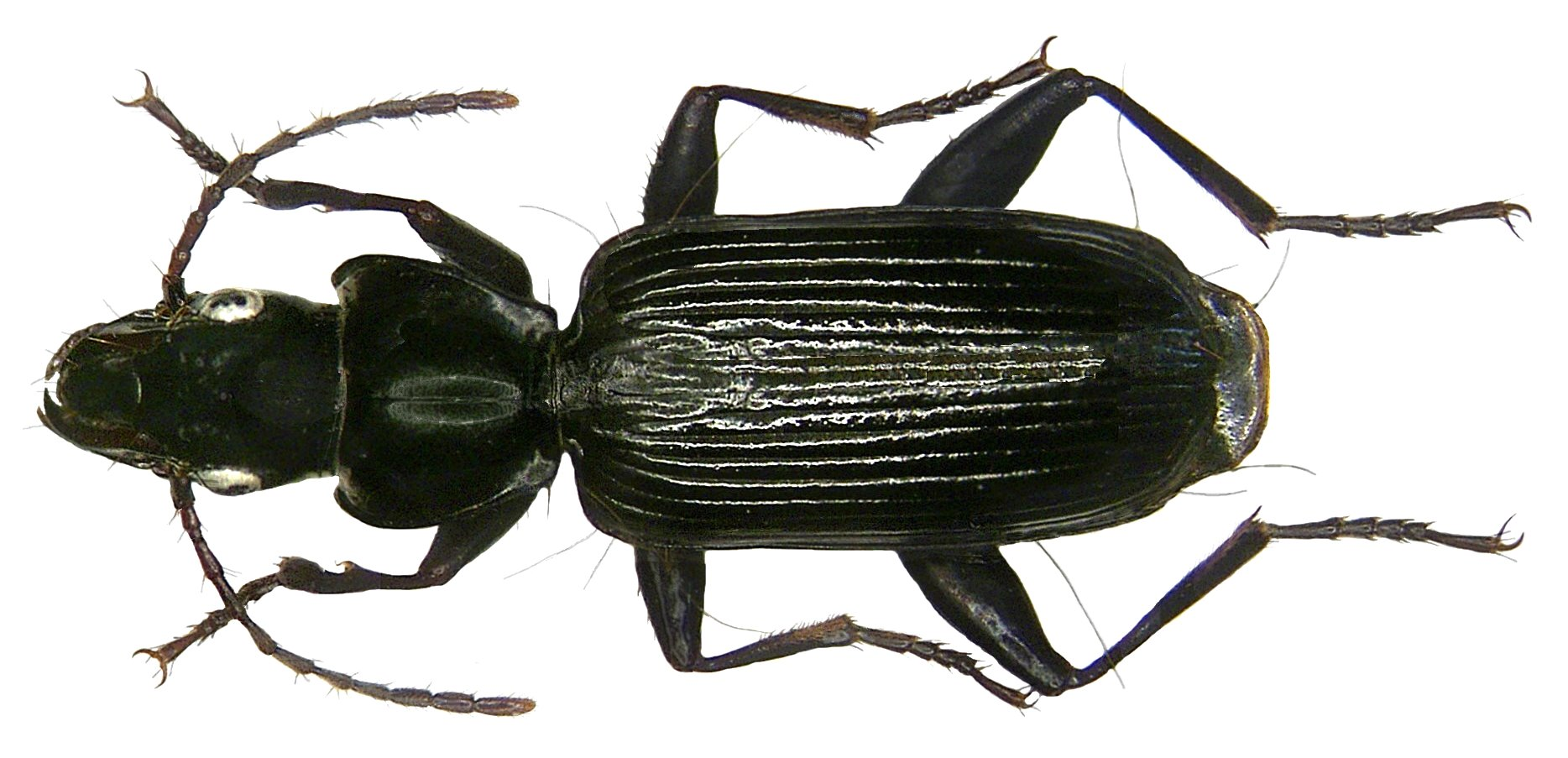
- Miscelus unicolor

Scientific classification
- Domain: Eukaryota
- Kingdom: Animalia
- Phylum: Arthropoda
- Class: Insecta
- Order: Coleoptera
- Suborder: Adephaga
- Family: Carabidae
- Subfamily: Lebiinae
- Tribe: Lebiini
- Subtribe: Pericalina
- Genus: Miscelus; Klug, 1834

Synonyms
- Leptodactyla Brullé, 1834

= Miscelus =

Genus of beetles

Miscelus is a genus in the ground beetle family Carabidae. There are about five described species in Miscelus, found in Asia and Australia.

== Species ==
These five species belong to the genus Miscelus:

- Miscelus carinatus Andrewes, 1922 (India, Laos)
- Miscelus javanus Klug, 1834 (southern, southeastern, and eastern Asia)
- Miscelus luctuosus Putzeys, 1875 (New Guinea)
- Miscelus sibling Darlington, 1968 (Indonesia, New Guinea)
- Miscelus unicolor Putzeys, 1845 (southern, southeastern, and eastern Asia, Australia)
