= Lobodontulus =

Scientific classification
- Kingdom: Animalia
- Phylum: Arthropoda
- Clade: Pancrustacea
- Class: Insecta
- Order: Coleoptera
- Suborder: Adephaga
- Family: Carabidae
- Tribe: Lebiini
- Subtribe: Pericalina
- Genus: Lobodontulus; Basilewsky, 1970
- Species: L. mirei

Binomial name
- Lobodontulus mirei Basilewsky, 1970

Genus of beetles

Lobodontulus is a genus in the ground beetle family Carabidae. This genus has a single species, Lobodontulus mirei. It is found in Cameroon.
