= Catascopellus =

Scientific classification
- Kingdom: Animalia
- Phylum: Arthropoda
- Class: Insecta
- Order: Coleoptera
- Suborder: Adephaga
- Family: Carabidae
- Tribe: Lebiini
- Subtribe: Pericalina
- Genus: Catascopellus; Straneo, 1969
- Species: C. crassiceps

Binomial name
- Catascopellus crassiceps Straneo, 1969

Genus of beetles

Catascopellus is a genus in the ground beetle family Carabidae. This genus has a single species, Catascopellus crassiceps. It is found in Chile.
