= Phacocerus =

Scientific classification
- Domain: Eukaryota
- Kingdom: Animalia
- Phylum: Arthropoda
- Class: Insecta
- Order: Coleoptera
- Suborder: Adephaga
- Family: Carabidae
- Tribe: Lebiini
- Subtribe: Agrina
- Genus: Phacocerus; Chaudoir, 1873
- Species: P. piceus

Binomial name
- Phacocerus piceus Chaudoir, 1873

Genus of beetles

Phacocerus is a genus in the ground beetle family Carabidae. This genus has a single species, Phacocerus piceus. It is found in Brazil.
