= Zolotarevskyella =

Scientific classification
- Domain: Eukaryota
- Kingdom: Animalia
- Phylum: Arthropoda
- Class: Insecta
- Order: Coleoptera
- Suborder: Adephaga
- Family: Carabidae
- Subfamily: Lebiinae
- Tribe: Lebiini
- Subtribe: Dromiusina
- Genus: Zolotarevskyella; Mateu, 1953

Genus of beetles

Zolotarevskyella is a genus of beetles in the family Carabidae, containing the following species:

- Zolotarevskyella afghana Mateu, 1976
- Zolotarevskyella rhytidera (Chaudoir, 1876)
- Zolotarevskyella strigicollis (Wollaston, 1867)
