= Paraglycia =

Scientific classification
- Domain: Eukaryota
- Kingdom: Animalia
- Phylum: Arthropoda
- Class: Insecta
- Order: Coleoptera
- Suborder: Adephaga
- Family: Carabidae
- Subfamily: Lebiinae
- Tribe: Lebiini
- Subtribe: Agrina
- Genus: Paraglycia; Bedel, 1904

Genus of beetles

Paraglycia is a genus in the ground beetle family Carabidae. There are about six described species in Paraglycia.

== Species ==
These six species belong to the genus Paraglycia:

- Paraglycia castanea (Boheman, 1848) (South Africa)
- Paraglycia cyanochloris Felix & Muilwijk in Felix, 2009 (United Arab Emirates)
- Paraglycia obscuripennis (Fairmaire, 1886) (Yemen, Somalia)
- Paraglycia picea (Boheman, 1848) (DR Congo, Zimbabwe, Botswana, South Africa)
- Paraglycia rufula (Gory, 1833) (Ivory Coast, Rwanda)
- Paraglycia sulcatula (Fairmaire, 1887) (Somalia)
