= Daer ales =

Scientific classification
- Domain: Eukaryota
- Kingdom: Animalia
- Phylum: Arthropoda
- Class: Insecta
- Order: Coleoptera
- Suborder: Adephaga
- Family: Carabidae
- Tribe: Lebiini
- Subtribe: Lebiina
- Genus: Daer; Semenov & Znojko, 1929
- Species: D. ales

Binomial name
- Daer ales Semenov & Znojko, 1929

Species of beetle

Daer ales is a species of beetle in the family Carabidae, the only species in the genus Daer. It is found in Kazakhstan, Uzbekistan, and Tadzhikistan.
