= Monnea =

Scientific classification
- Domain: Eukaryota
- Kingdom: Animalia
- Phylum: Arthropoda
- Class: Insecta
- Order: Coleoptera
- Suborder: Adephaga
- Family: Carabidae
- Tribe: Lebiini
- Subtribe: Dromiusina
- Genus: Monnea; Mateu, 1970
- Species: M. decora

Binomial name
- Monnea decora (Steinheil, 1869)

Genus of beetles

Monnea is a genus in the ground beetle family Carabidae. This genus has a single species, Monnea decora. It is found in Argentina, Paraguay, and Uruguay.
