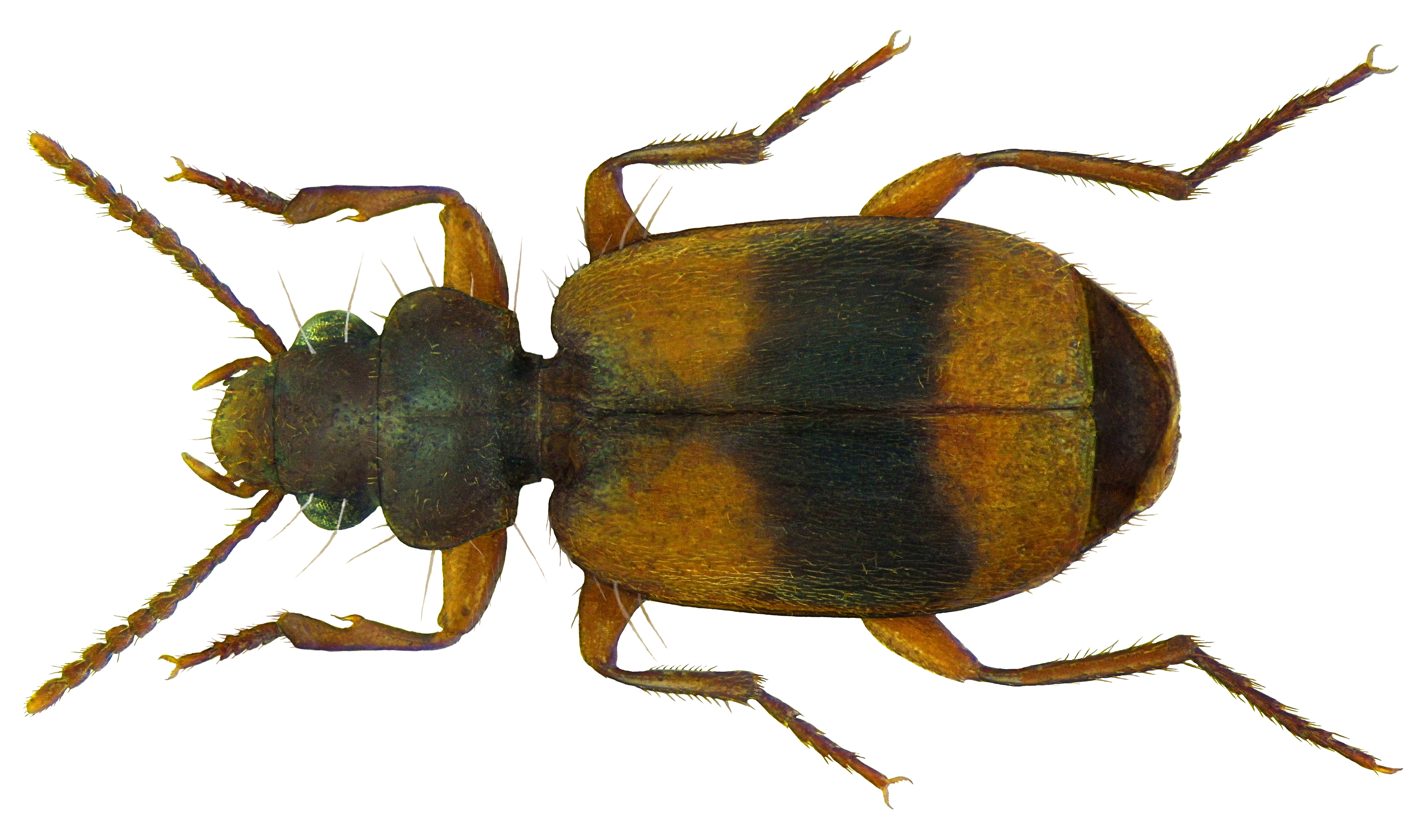
- Somotrichus unifasciatus

Scientific classification
- Kingdom: Animalia
- Phylum: Arthropoda
- Clade: Pancrustacea
- Class: Insecta
- Order: Coleoptera
- Suborder: Adephaga
- Family: Carabidae
- Tribe: Lebiini
- Subtribe: Somotrichina
- Genus: Somotrichus; Seidlitz, 1887
- Species: S. unifasciatus

Binomial name
- Somotrichus unifasciatus (Dejean, 1831)

= Somotrichus =

Genus of beetles

Somotrichus is a genus in the beetle family Carabidae. This genus has a single species, Somotrichus unifasciatus. It is found in the Holarctic.
