= Pseudomasoreus =

Scientific classification
- Domain: Eukaryota
- Kingdom: Animalia
- Phylum: Arthropoda
- Class: Insecta
- Order: Coleoptera
- Suborder: Adephaga
- Family: Carabidae
- Subfamily: Lebiinae
- Tribe: Lebiini
- Subtribe: Cymindidina
- Genus: Pseudomasoreus; Desbrochers des Loges, 1904

Genus of beetles

Pseudomasoreus is a genus in the beetle family Carabidae. There are more than 20 described species in Pseudomasoreus.

== Species ==
These 21 species belong to the genus Pseudomasoreus:

- Pseudomasoreus balli Basilewsky, 1984 (South Africa)
- Pseudomasoreus basilewskyi (Ball & Hilchie, 1983) (South Africa)
- Pseudomasoreus canigoulensis (Fairmaire & Laboulbène, 1854) (France, Spain, Sicily, Italy, Malta, Morocco, and Algeria)
- Pseudomasoreus capicola Basilewsky, 1954 (South Africa)
- Pseudomasoreus catalai Jeannel, 1949 (Madagascar)
- Pseudomasoreus decorsei Jeannel, 1941 (Madagascar)
- Pseudomasoreus descarpentriesi Mateu, 1980 (Madagascar)
- Pseudomasoreus deuvei Casale, 1998 (Madagascar)
- Pseudomasoreus hereai Mateu, 1980 (Madagascar)
- Pseudomasoreus inopinatus Jeannel, 1941 (Madagascar)
- Pseudomasoreus jocquei Basilewsky, 1984 (Malawi)
- Pseudomasoreus kilimanus Basilewsky, 1962 (Tanzania)
- Pseudomasoreus madecassus Mateu, 1970 (Madagascar)
- Pseudomasoreus mantasoanus Mateu, 1980 (Madagascar)
- Pseudomasoreus mateui (Ball & Hilchie, 1983) (South Africa)
- Pseudomasoreus meridionalis Jeannel, 1955 (Madagascar)
- Pseudomasoreus pauliani Basilewsky, 1953 (Madagascar)
- Pseudomasoreus ranomafanae Kavanaugh & Rainio, 2016 (Madagascar)
- Pseudomasoreus reticulatus (Ball & Hilchie, 1983) (South Africa)
- Pseudomasoreus thoracicus (Ball & Hilchie, 1983) (South Africa)
- Pseudomasoreus uluguruanus Basilewsky, 1962 (Tanzania)
