= Mimophilorhizus =

Scientific classification
- Domain: Eukaryota
- Kingdom: Animalia
- Phylum: Arthropoda
- Class: Insecta
- Order: Coleoptera
- Suborder: Adephaga
- Family: Carabidae
- Tribe: Lebiini
- Subtribe: Agrina
- Genus: Mimophilorhizus; Mateu, 1993
- Species: M. chilensis

Binomial name
- Mimophilorhizus chilensis Mateu, 1993

Genus of beetles

Mimophilorhizus is a genus in the ground beetle family Carabidae. This genus has a single species, Mimophilorhizus chilensis. It is found in Chile and Argentina.
