= Somalodromius =

Scientific classification
- Domain: Eukaryota
- Kingdom: Animalia
- Phylum: Arthropoda
- Class: Insecta
- Order: Coleoptera
- Suborder: Adephaga
- Family: Carabidae
- Tribe: Lebiini
- Subtribe: Dromiusina
- Genus: Somalodromius; Mateu, 1967
- Species: S. basilewskyi

Binomial name
- Somalodromius basilewskyi Mateu, 1967

Genus of beetles

Somalodromius is a genus in the ground beetle family Carabidae. This genus has a single species, Somalodromius basilewskyi. It is found in Somalia.
