= Thysanotus (beetle) =

Scientific classification
- Kingdom: Animalia
- Phylum: Arthropoda
- Class: Insecta
- Order: Coleoptera
- Suborder: Adephaga
- Family: Carabidae
- Subfamily: Lebiinae
- Tribe: Lebiini
- Subtribe: Pericalina
- Genus: Thysanotus; Chaudoir, 1848

Genus of beetles

Thysanotus is a genus of beetles in the family Carabidae, containing the following species:

- Thysanotus ambreanus Jeannel, 1949
- Thysanotus anchomenoides (Gory & Castelnau, 1837)
- Thysanotus apicalis (Alluaud, 1936)
- Thysanotus consobrinus Jeannel, 1949
- Thysanotus dentipes (Jeannel, 1955)
- Thysanotus dilutipes (Fairmaire, 1896)
- Thysanotus gracilis} Jeannel, 1949
- Thysanotus madagascariensis (Chaudoir, 1850)
- Thysanotus mirabilis (Alluaud, 1895)
- Thysanotus nosybianus Jeannel, 1949
- Thysanotus olsoufieffi Jeannel, 1949
- Thysanotus spinipennis (Alluaud, 1936)
- Thysanotus spinosus (Alluaud, 1936)
- Thysanotus tenuestriatus Jeannel, 1949
- Thysanotus vadoni Jeannel, 1949
