= Dontolobus =

Scientific classification
- Domain: Eukaryota
- Kingdom: Animalia
- Phylum: Arthropoda
- Class: Insecta
- Order: Coleoptera
- Suborder: Adephaga
- Family: Carabidae
- Tribe: Lebiini
- Genus: Dontolobus; Basilewsky, 1970

Genus of beetles

Dontolobus is a genus of beetles in the family Carabidae.

== Species ==
Dontolobus contains the following nine species:

- Dontolobus aemiliae Facchini, 2012
- Dontolobus ivorensis Facchini, 2012
- Dontolobus labroexcisus Facchini, 2017
- Dontolobus mirei Basilewsky, 1970
- Dontolobus pallidus (Burgeon, 1937)
- Dontolobus sachtlebeni (Basilewsky, 1942)
- Dontolobus setosanalis Basilewsky, 1970
- Dontolobus similis Facchini, 2017
- Dontolobus trinotatus Facchini, 2012
