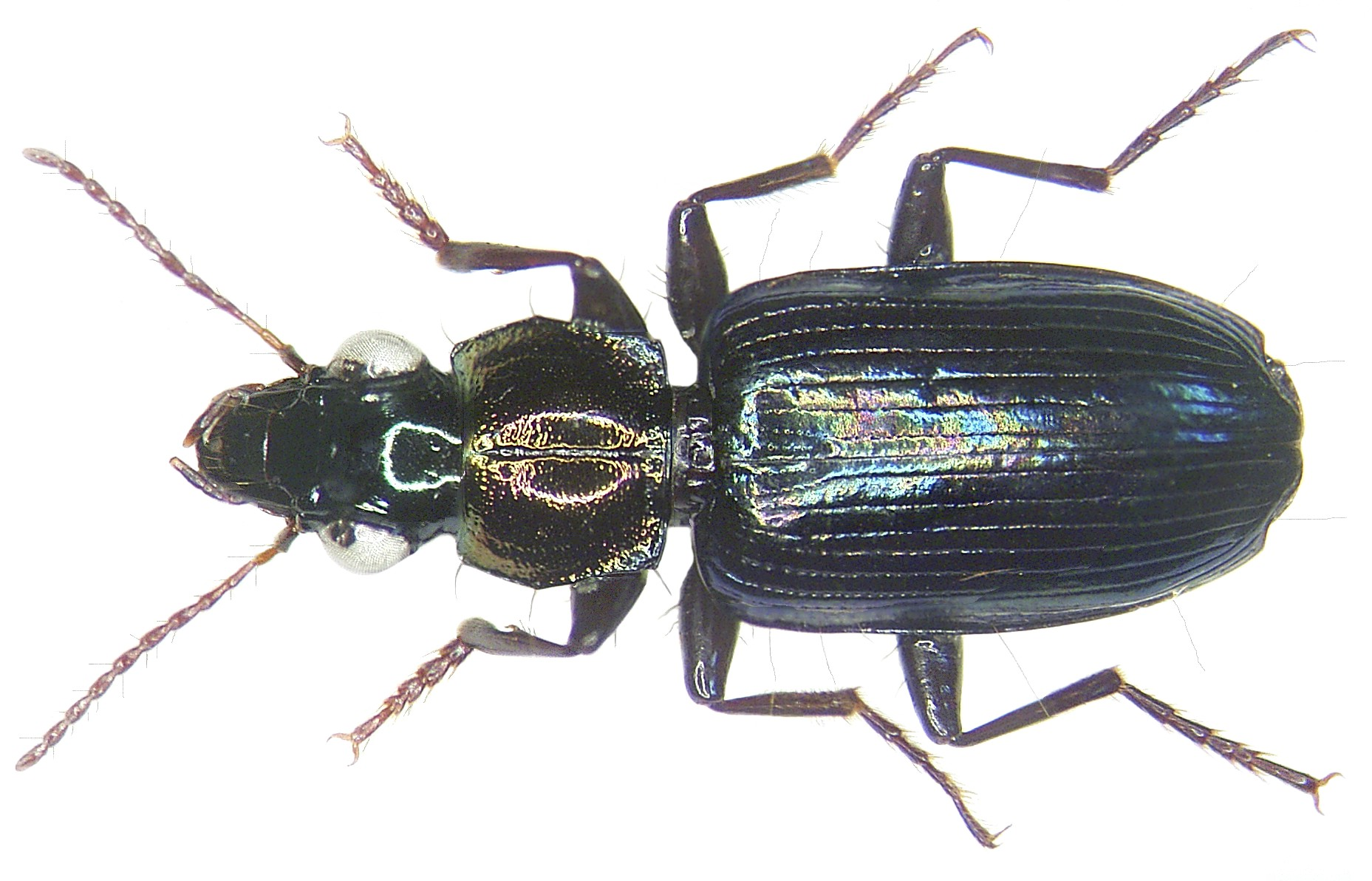
- H. elongatus

Scientific classification
- Domain: Eukaryota
- Kingdom: Animalia
- Phylum: Arthropoda
- Class: Insecta
- Order: Coleoptera
- Suborder: Adephaga
- Family: Carabidae
- Subfamily: Lebiinae
- Tribe: Lebiini
- Subtribe: Pericalina
- Genus: Holcoderus; Chaudoir, 1870

= Holcoderus =

Genus of beetles

Holcoderus is a genus in the beetle family Carabidae. There are more than 20 described species in Holcoderus.

== Species ==
These 27 species belong to the genus Holcoderus:

- Holcoderus aeripennis Andrewes, 1931 (India)
- Holcoderus alacer Andrewes, 1937 (India)
- Holcoderus bisetus Liu; Shi & Liang, 2019 (China)
- Holcoderus brunnescens (Jedlicka, 1935) (Philippines)
- Holcoderus caeruleipennis Sloane, 1910 (Australia)
- Holcoderus carinatus Andrewes, 1933 (India)
- Holcoderus chrysomeloides Andrewes, 1930 (Indonesia)
- Holcoderus decolor Darlington, 1970 (Indonesia)
- Holcoderus dentatus Louwerens, 1949 (Indonesia)
- Holcoderus elegans Louwerens, 1958 (Indonesia)
- Holcoderus elongatus (Saunders, 1863) (Indonesia and New Guinea)
- Holcoderus fissus Andrewes, 1933 (Nepal, Sri Lanka, and India)
- Holcoderus formosanus Jedlicka, 1940 (China and Taiwan)
- Holcoderus gloriosus Andrewes, 1931 (Indonesia)
- Holcoderus gracilis (Oberthür, 1883) (Vietnam, Malaysia, Indonesia, and Philippines)
- Holcoderus marginalis Louwerens, 1949 (Indonesia)
- Holcoderus niger Andrewes, 1937 (India)
- Holcoderus obscurus Habu, 1979 (Nepal)
- Holcoderus ophthalmicus Louwerens, 1953 (Indonesia)
- Holcoderus overbecki Emden, 1937 (Indonesia)
- Holcoderus praemorsus Chaudoir, 1870 (Sri Lanka)
- Holcoderus puncticeps Andrewes, 1930 (Indonesia)
- Holcoderus quadrifoveatus Louwerens, 1951 (Indonesia)
- Holcoderus quadripunctatus Louwerens, 1956 (Indonesia)
- Holcoderus smaragdinus Andrewes, 1926 (Vietnam, Indonesia, and Borneo)
- Holcoderus superbus Andrewes, 1933 (India)
- Holcoderus trichias Andrewes, 1930 (Indonesia)
