= Metascopus =

Scientific classification
- Domain: Eukaryota
- Kingdom: Animalia
- Phylum: Arthropoda
- Class: Insecta
- Order: Coleoptera
- Suborder: Adephaga
- Family: Carabidae
- Tribe: Lebiini
- Subtribe: Pericalina
- Genus: Metascopus; Basilewsky, 1970
- Species: M. camerunicus

Binomial name
- Metascopus camerunicus Basilewsky, 1970

Genus of beetles

Metascopus is a genus in the ground beetle family Carabidae. This genus has a single species, Metascopus camerunicus. It is found in Cameroon.
