= Crassagena =

Scientific classification
- Domain: Eukaryota
- Kingdom: Animalia
- Phylum: Arthropoda
- Class: Insecta
- Order: Coleoptera
- Suborder: Adephaga
- Family: Carabidae
- Subfamily: Lebiinae
- Tribe: Lebiini
- Subtribe: Pericalina
- Genus: Crassagena; Baehr, 2006
- Species: C. depressa

Binomial name
- Crassagena depressa Baehr, 2006

Genus of beetles

Crassagena is a genus in the ground beetle family Carabidae. This genus has a single species, Crassagena depressa.
