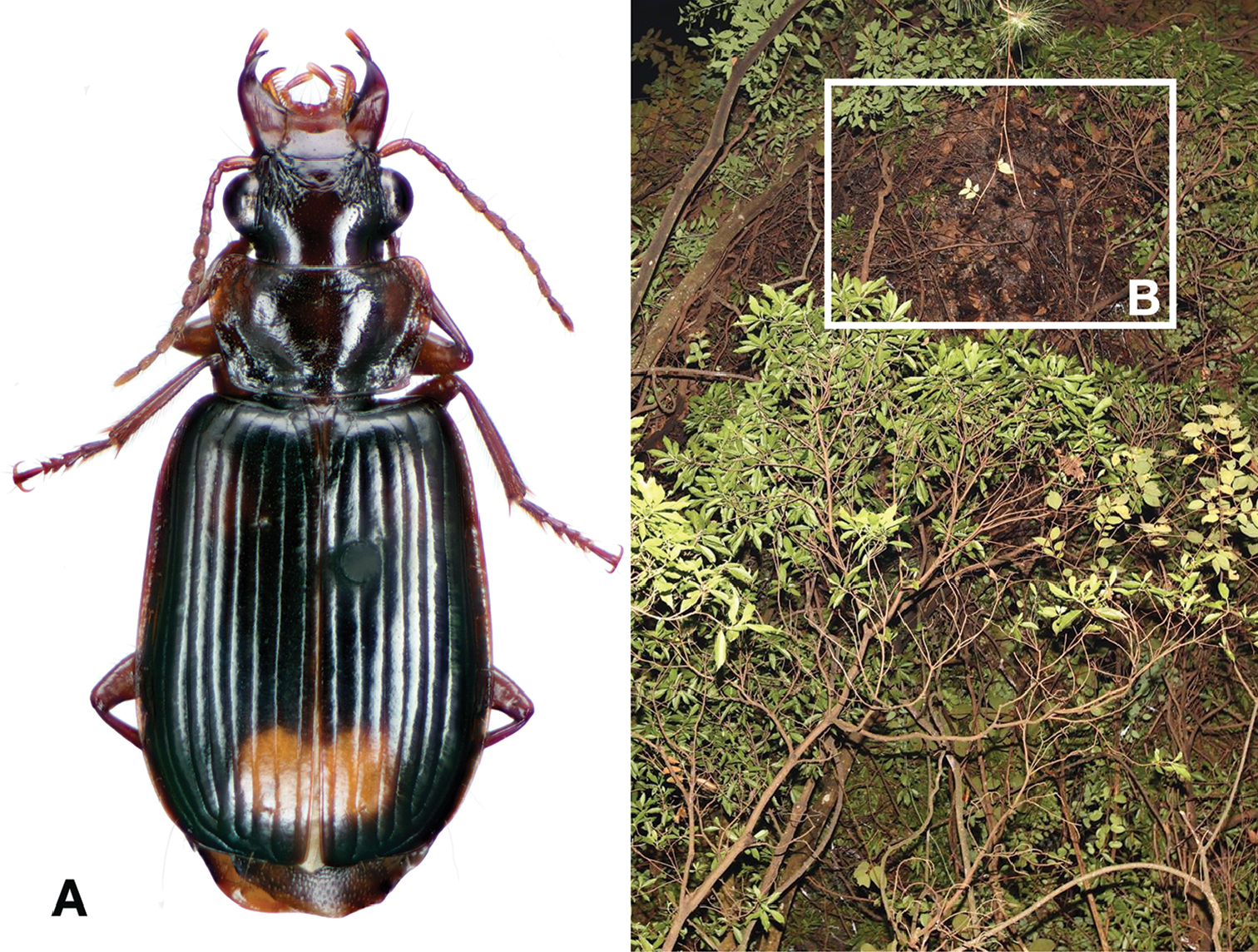
- Horniulus andrewesi

Scientific classification
- Domain: Eukaryota
- Kingdom: Animalia
- Phylum: Arthropoda
- Class: Insecta
- Order: Coleoptera
- Suborder: Adephaga
- Family: Carabidae
- Subfamily: Lebiinae
- Tribe: Lebiini
- Subtribe: Pericalina
- Genus: Horniulus; Jedlicka, 1932

= Horniulus =

Genus of beetles

Horniulus is a genus of beetles in the family Carabidae, containing the following species:

- Horniulus andrewesi Jedlicka, 1932 (Taiwan)
- Horniulus quadrimaculatus Louwerens, 1953 (Indonesia)
