= Tantillus =

Scientific classification
- Domain: Eukaryota
- Kingdom: Animalia
- Phylum: Arthropoda
- Class: Insecta
- Order: Coleoptera
- Suborder: Adephaga
- Family: Carabidae
- Subfamily: Lebiinae
- Tribe: Lebiini
- Subtribe: Pericalina
- Genus: Tantillus; Chaudoir, 1870

Synonyms
- Mochtheroides Andrewes, 1923

Genus of beetles

Tantillus is a genus of ground beetles in the family Carabidae. There are about 12 described species in Tantillus, found in South and Southeast Asia.

== Species ==
These 12 species belong to the genus Tantillus:

- Tantillus brunneus Chaudoir, 1870 (Sri Lanka)
- Tantillus imbricatus Fedorenko, 2018 (Borneo, Indonesia, and Malaysia)
- Tantillus klapperichi (Jedlicka, 1953) (China)
- Tantillus longipenis Fedorenko, 2018 (Vietnam)
- Tantillus niger (Jedlicka, 1934) (Papua and Philippines)
- Tantillus philippinensis (Jedlicka, 1934) (Philippines)
- Tantillus quadripunctatus Fedorenko, 2018 (Sri Lanka)
- Tantillus reflexicollis Fedorenko, 2018 (India)
- Tantillus semiopacus Fedorenko, 2018 (Vietnam)
- Tantillus sericans (Schmidt-Goebel, 1846) (Indonesia, Myanmar, and Singapore)
- Tantillus subnitens Fedorenko, 2018 (Vietnam)
- Tantillus vittatus Bates, 1886 (Sri Lanka)
