= Petrimagnia =

Scientific classification
- Domain: Eukaryota
- Kingdom: Animalia
- Phylum: Arthropoda
- Class: Insecta
- Order: Coleoptera
- Suborder: Adephaga
- Family: Carabidae
- Tribe: Lebiini
- Subtribe: Cymindidina
- Genus: Petrimagnia; Kryzhanovskij & Mikhailov, 1971
- Species: P. horricoma

Binomial name
- Petrimagnia horricoma Kryzhanovskij & Mikhailov, 1971

Genus of beetles

Petrimagnia is a genus in the ground beetle family Carabidae. This genus has a single species, Petrimagnia horricoma. It is found in Tadzhikistan.
