= Metaxymorphus =

Scientific classification
- Domain: Eukaryota
- Kingdom: Animalia
- Phylum: Arthropoda
- Class: Insecta
- Order: Coleoptera
- Suborder: Adephaga
- Family: Carabidae
- Subfamily: Lebiinae
- Tribe: Lebiini
- Subtribe: Cymindidina
- Genus: Metaxymorphus; Chaudoir, 1850

Subgenera
- Callidomorphus Péringuey, 1896; Metaxymorphus Chaudoir, 1850; Periphobus Péringuey, 1896

Synonyms
- Callidomorphus Péringuey, 1896; Lachanissus Péringuey, 1896

Genus of beetles

Metaxymorphus is a genus in the ground beetle family Carabidae. There are more than 20 described species in Metaxymorphus, found in South Africa.

== Species ==
These 28 species belong to the genus Metaxymorphus:

- Metaxymorphus affinis Péringuey, 1896
- Metaxymorphus agilis Péringuey, 1896
- Metaxymorphus angustissimus (Motschulsky, 1865)
- Metaxymorphus atriceps Péringuey, 1896
- Metaxymorphus confusus (Basilewsky, 1956)
- Metaxymorphus cursor Péringuey, 1896
- Metaxymorphus cycloderus Chaudoir, 1877
- Metaxymorphus debilis Péringuey, 1898
- Metaxymorphus deceptor (Péringuey, 1896)
- Metaxymorphus discipennis (Motschulsky, 1864)
- Metaxymorphus endroedyi (Basilewsky, 1986)
- Metaxymorphus ferox (Péringuey, 1896)
- Metaxymorphus flaviceps (Motschulsky, 1864)
- Metaxymorphus frenatus (Dejean, 1831)
- Metaxymorphus glabricollis (Motschulsky, 1865)
- Metaxymorphus goryi Chaudoir, 1850
- Metaxymorphus inconspicuus (Péringuey, 1896)
- Metaxymorphus infestans (Basilewsky, 1986)
- Metaxymorphus lineellus (Boheman, 1848)
- Metaxymorphus modestus Péringuey, 1896
- Metaxymorphus namaquensis Péringuey, 1896
- Metaxymorphus picturatus (Basilewsky, 1986)
- Metaxymorphus pictus Péringuey, 1896
- Metaxymorphus pusillus Péringuey, 1896
- Metaxymorphus recticollis Péringuey, 1898
- Metaxymorphus robustus Péringuey, 1904
- Metaxymorphus stigmatellus Péringuey, 1896
- Metaxymorphus vicinus Péringuey, 1896
