= Orthobasis =

Scientific classification
- Kingdom: Animalia
- Phylum: Arthropoda
- Clade: Pancrustacea
- Class: Insecta
- Order: Coleoptera
- Suborder: Adephaga
- Family: Carabidae
- Tribe: Lebiini
- Subtribe: Lebiina
- Genus: Orthobasis; Chaudoir, 1871
- Species: O. bicolor

Binomial name
- Orthobasis bicolor (Dejean, 1831)

Genus of beetles

Orthobasis is a genus in the ground beetle family Carabidae. This genus has a single species, Orthobasis bicolor. It is found in Africa.
