= Gallerucidia =

Scientific classification
- Domain: Eukaryota
- Kingdom: Animalia
- Phylum: Arthropoda
- Class: Insecta
- Order: Coleoptera
- Suborder: Adephaga
- Family: Carabidae
- Subfamily: Lebiinae
- Tribe: Lebiini
- Subtribe: Gallerucidiina
- Genus: Gallerucidia; Chaudoir, 1872

Genus of beetles

Gallerucidia is a genus in the beetle family Carabidae. There are about five described species in Gallerucidia.

== Species ==
These five species belong to the genus Gallerucidia:

- Gallerucidia basinotata Chaudoir, 1872 (Brazil)
- Gallerucidia championi Bates, 1883 (Guatemala)
- Gallerucidia dimidiata Chaudoir, 1872 (Cuba)
- Gallerucidia erotyloides Bates, 1883 (Guatemala and Mexico)
- Gallerucidia octonotata Chaudoir, 1872 (Brazil)
