= Megalebia =

Scientific classification
- Domain: Eukaryota
- Kingdom: Animalia
- Phylum: Arthropoda
- Class: Insecta
- Order: Coleoptera
- Suborder: Adephaga
- Family: Carabidae
- Subfamily: Lebiinae
- Tribe: Lebiini
- Subtribe: Lebiina
- Genus: Megalebia; Mateu, 1972

Genus of beetles

Megalebia is a genus in the ground beetle family Carabidae. There are at least two described species in Megalebia, found in Madagascar.

== Species ==
These two species belong to the genus Megalebia:

- Megalebia colasi Mateu, 1972
- Megalebia nigrotestacea Mateu, 1972
