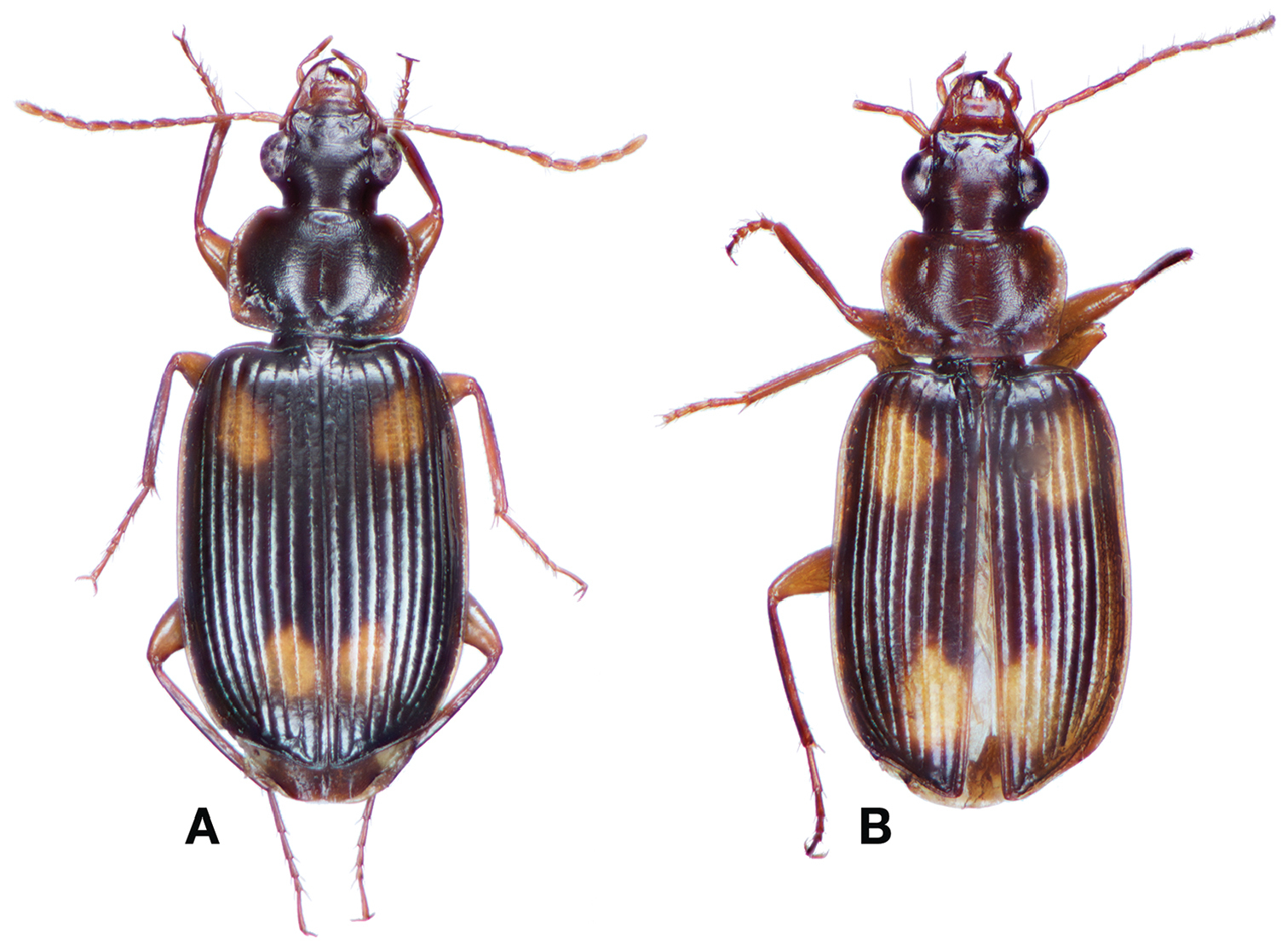
- Brachichila hypocrita

Scientific classification
- Domain: Eukaryota
- Kingdom: Animalia
- Phylum: Arthropoda
- Class: Insecta
- Order: Coleoptera
- Suborder: Adephaga
- Family: Carabidae
- Subfamily: Lebiinae
- Tribe: Lebiini
- Subtribe: Pericalina
- Genus: Brachichila; Chaudoir, 1870

= Brachichila =

Genus of beetles

Brachichila is a genus in the beetle family Carabidae. There are about seven described species in Brachichila, in Southeast Asia.

== Species ==
These seven species belong to the genus Brachichila:

- Brachichila fischeri Kirschenhofer, 1994 (Vietnam)
- Brachichila hypocrita Chaudoir, 1870 (China, Japan, Taiwan, India, and Vietnam)
- Brachichila maculata Kirschenhofer, 1996 (Thailand)
- Brachichila malickyi Kirschenhofer, 1996 (Thailand)
- Brachichila midas Kirschenhofer, 1994 (Vietnam)
- Brachichila sabahensis Kirschenhofer, 2010 (Indonesia and Borneo)
- Brachichila vietnamensis Kirschenhofer, 1996 (Vietnam)
