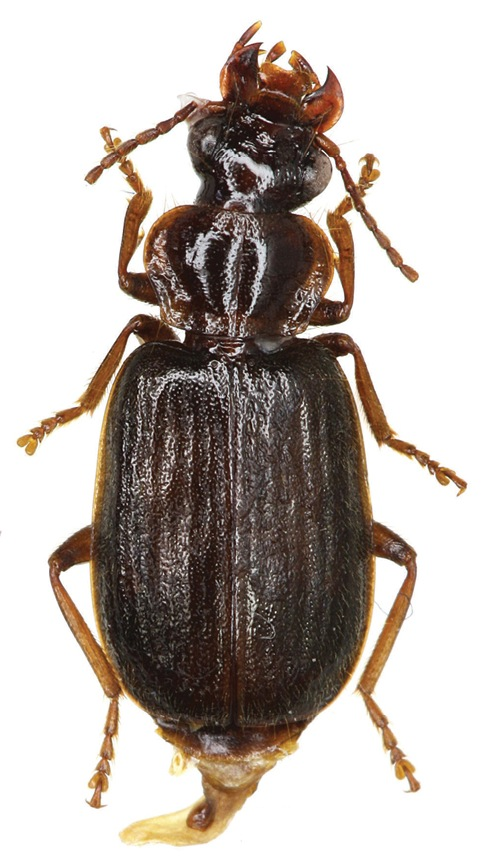
- Endynomena pradieri

Scientific classification
- Kingdom: Animalia
- Phylum: Arthropoda
- Class: Insecta
- Order: Coleoptera
- Suborder: Adephaga
- Family: Carabidae
- Subfamily: Lebiinae
- Tribe: Lebiini
- Subtribe: Physoderina
- Genus: Endynomena; Chaudoir, 1873
- Species: E. pradieri

Binomial name
- Endynomena pradieri (Fairmaire, 1849)

Synonyms
- Saronychium Blackburn, 1877

= Endynomena =

Genus of beetles

Endynomena is a genus in the ground beetle family Carabidae. This genus has a single species, Endynomena pradieri. It is found in eastern and southeastern Asia, and in Pacific islands.
