= Infernophilus =

Scientific classification
- Domain: Eukaryota
- Kingdom: Animalia
- Phylum: Arthropoda
- Class: Insecta
- Order: Coleoptera
- Suborder: Adephaga
- Family: Carabidae
- Tribe: Lebiini
- Subtribe: Agrina
- Genus: Infernophilus; Larson, 1969
- Species: I. castaneus

Binomial name
- Infernophilus castaneus (G.Horn, 1882)

Genus of beetles

Infernophilus is a genus in the ground beetle family Carabidae. This genus has a single species, Infernophilus castaneus. It is found in the United States.
