= Mimovelindopsis =

Scientific classification
- Domain: Eukaryota
- Kingdom: Animalia
- Phylum: Arthropoda
- Class: Insecta
- Order: Coleoptera
- Suborder: Adephaga
- Family: Carabidae
- Subfamily: Lebiinae
- Tribe: Lebiini
- Subtribe: Lichnasthenina
- Genus: Mimovelindopsis; Mateu, 1963

Genus of beetles

Mimovelindopsis is a genus in the beetle family Carabidae. There are at least two described species in Mimovelindopsis, found in Africa.

== Species ==
These two species belong to the genus Mimovelindopsis:

- Mimovelindopsis quadriguttata Facchini, 2011 (Zambia)
- Mimovelindopsis rufotestacea (Mateu, 1963) (Africa)
