= Rhopalostyla =

Scientific classification
- Kingdom: Animalia
- Phylum: Arthropoda
- Class: Insecta
- Order: Coleoptera
- Suborder: Adephaga
- Family: Carabidae
- Tribe: Lebiini
- Subtribe: Lebiina
- Genus: Rhopalostyla; Chaudoir, 1850
- Species: R. virgata

Binomial name
- Rhopalostyla virgata (Motschulsky, 1844)

Synonyms
- Taenioptilon Motschulsky, 1859

Genus of beetles

Rhopalostyla is a genus in the ground beetle family Carabidae. This genus has a single species, Rhopalostyla virgata. It is found in Kazakhstan and Russia.
