= Menarus =

Scientific classification
- Domain: Eukaryota
- Kingdom: Animalia
- Phylum: Arthropoda
- Class: Insecta
- Order: Coleoptera
- Suborder: Adephaga
- Family: Carabidae
- Subfamily: Lebiinae
- Tribe: Lebiini
- Subtribe: Pericalina
- Genus: Menarus; Andrewes, 1939

Genus of beetles

Menarus is a genus in the beetle family Carabidae. There are about five described species in Menarus.

== Species ==
These five species belong to the genus Menarus:

- Menarus borneensis Jedlicka, 1934 (Indonesia and Borneo)
- Menarus philippinensis Jedlicka, 1934 (Philippines)
- Menarus quadrimaculatus Jedlicka, 1935 (Malaysia, Indonesia, and Borneo)
- Menarus sarawaki Jedlicka, 1935 (Indonesia and Borneo)
- Menarus testaceus Jedlicka, 1934 (Indonesia and Borneo)
