= Lebistinida =

Scientific classification
- Kingdom: Animalia
- Phylum: Arthropoda
- Class: Insecta
- Order: Coleoptera
- Suborder: Adephaga
- Family: Carabidae
- Tribe: Lebiini
- Subtribe: Lebiina
- Genus: Lebistinida; Péringuey, 1898
- Species: L. pulchra

Binomial name
- Lebistinida pulchra Péringuey, 1898

Genus of beetles

Lebistinida is a genus in the ground beetle family Carabidae. This genus has a single species, Lebistinida pulchra. It is found in South Africa.
