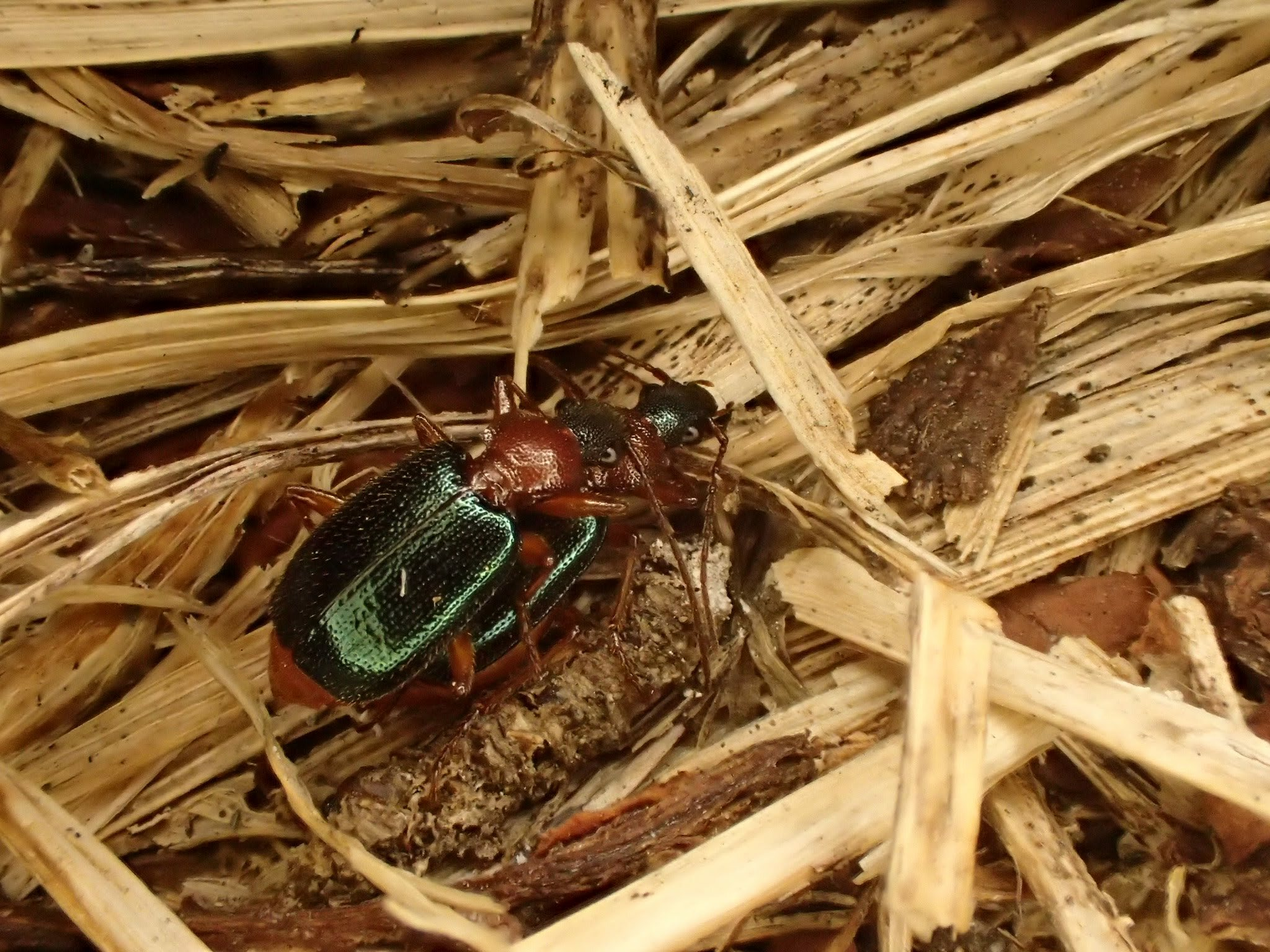
- Lachnolebia cribricollis, Japan

Scientific classification
- Domain: Eukaryota
- Kingdom: Animalia
- Phylum: Arthropoda
- Class: Insecta
- Order: Coleoptera
- Suborder: Adephaga
- Family: Carabidae
- Subfamily: Lebiinae
- Tribe: Lebiini
- Subtribe: Lebiina
- Genus: Lachnolebia; Maindron, 1905

Synonyms
- Dictya Chaudoir, 1871

= Lachnolebia =

Genus of beetles

Lachnolebia is a genus in the ground beetle family Carabidae. There are at least two described species in Lachnolebia, found in eastern Asia.

== Species ==
These two species belong to the genus Lachnolebia:

- Lachnolebia cribricollis (A.Morawitz, 1862) (China, Korea, Japan, Russia)
- Lachnolebia shimian Kirschenhofer, 2010 (China)
