= Callidadelpha =

Scientific classification
- Domain: Eukaryota
- Kingdom: Animalia
- Phylum: Arthropoda
- Class: Insecta
- Order: Coleoptera
- Suborder: Adephaga
- Family: Carabidae
- Tribe: Lebiini
- Subtribe: Agrina
- Genus: Callidadelpha; Steinheil, 1875
- Species: C. bogotana

Binomial name
- Callidadelpha bogotana Steinheil, 1875

Genus of beetles

Callidadelpha bogotana is a species of beetle in the family Carabidae, the only species in the genus Callidadelpha.
