= Pseudopachylebia =

Scientific classification
- Domain: Eukaryota
- Kingdom: Animalia
- Phylum: Arthropoda
- Class: Insecta
- Order: Coleoptera
- Suborder: Adephaga
- Family: Carabidae
- Tribe: Lebiini
- Subtribe: Lebiina
- Genus: Pseudopachylebia; Mateu, 1972
- Species: P. relucens

Binomial name
- Pseudopachylebia relucens Mateu, 1972

Genus of beetles

Pseudopachylebia is a genus in the ground beetle family Carabidae. This genus has a single species, Pseudopachylebia relucens. It is found in Madagascar.
