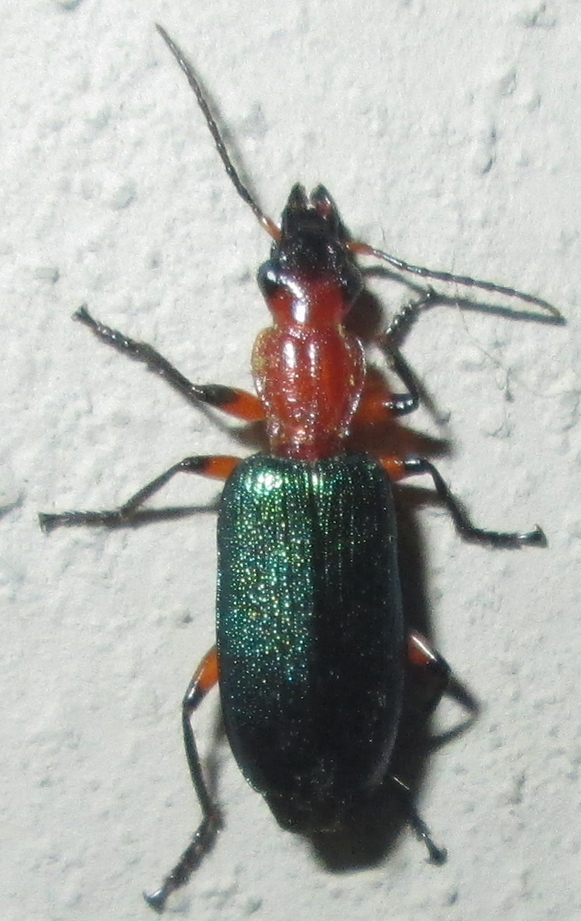
- Lipostratia, Botswana

Scientific classification
- Domain: Eukaryota
- Kingdom: Animalia
- Phylum: Arthropoda
- Class: Insecta
- Order: Coleoptera
- Suborder: Adephaga
- Family: Carabidae
- Subfamily: Lebiinae
- Tribe: Lebiini
- Subtribe: Agrina
- Genus: Lipostratia; Chaudoir, 1873

Synonyms
- Selousia Péringuey, 1896

= Lipostratia =

Genus of beetles

Lipostratia is a genus in the ground beetle family Carabidae. There are about nine described species in Lipostratia, found in Africa.

== Species ==
These nine species belong to the genus Lipostratia:

- Lipostratia cyaniventris Fairmaire, 1888 (Namibia, South Africa)
- Lipostratia dichroa (Chaudoir, 1848) (Africa)
- Lipostratia distinguenda (Fairmaire, 1886) (Saudi Arabia, Yemen, Soqotra, Eritrea, Djibouti, Somalia)
- Lipostratia elongata (Boheman, 1848) (Mozambique, Botswana, Namibia, South Africa)
- Lipostratia laeviceps Basilewsky, 1964 (Somalia)
- Lipostratia masaica Basilewsky, 1960 (Kenya, Tanzania)
- Lipostratia mouffleti Chaudoir, 1873 (Angola, Botswana)
- Lipostratia nobilis (Péringuey, 1896) (Congo, DR Congo, Tanzania, Zimbabwe)
- Lipostratia somalica Basilewsky, 1960 (Somalia)
