= Gidda barthelemyi =

Scientific classification
- Kingdom: Animalia
- Phylum: Arthropoda
- Class: Insecta
- Order: Coleoptera
- Suborder: Adephaga
- Family: Carabidae
- Tribe: Lebiini
- Subtribe: Pericalina
- Genus: Gidda; Andrewes, 1920
- Species: G. barthelemyi

Binomial name
- Gidda barthelemyi Andrewes, 1920

Species of beetles

Gidda barthelemyi is a species of beetle in the family Carabidae, the only species in the genus Gidda. It is found in Laos.
