= Pseudotoglossa =

Scientific classification
- Domain: Eukaryota
- Kingdom: Animalia
- Phylum: Arthropoda
- Class: Insecta
- Order: Coleoptera
- Suborder: Adephaga
- Family: Carabidae
- Subfamily: Lebiinae
- Tribe: Lebiini
- Subtribe: Agrina
- Genus: Pseudotoglossa; Mateu, 1961

Genus of beetles

Pseudotoglossa is a genus in the ground beetle family Carabidae. There are about seven described species in Pseudotoglossa, found in Central and South America.

== Species ==
These seven species belong to the genus Pseudotoglossa:

- Pseudotoglossa coelestina (Bates, 1878)
- Pseudotoglossa inaequalis (Chaudoir, 1873) (Venezuela, French Guiana, Peru, Brazil)
- Pseudotoglossa marginella (Bates, 1883) (Panama)
- Pseudotoglossa obscurella (Bates, 1878) (Colombia, Nicaragua, Belize)
- Pseudotoglossa rufitarsis (Chaudoir, 1877) (Colombia, Brazil, Panama, Nicaragua, Guatemala, Mexico)
- Pseudotoglossa semilaevis (Chaudoir, 1873) (Brazil)
- Pseudotoglossa terminalis (Chaudoir, 1873) (French Guiana, Peru, Brazil, Panama, Costa Rica, Nicaragua, Guatemala, Mexico)
