= Serrimargo =

Scientific classification
- Domain: Eukaryota
- Kingdom: Animalia
- Phylum: Arthropoda
- Class: Insecta
- Order: Coleoptera
- Suborder: Adephaga
- Family: Carabidae
- Subfamily: Lebiinae
- Tribe: Lebiini
- Subtribe: Pericalina
- Genus: Serrimargo; Chaudoir, 1870

Synonyms
- Peripristus Chaudoir, 1869

Genus of beetles

Serrimargo is a genus of ground beetles in the family Carabidae. There are about nine described species in Serrimargo.

== Species ==
These nine species belong to the genus Serrimargo:

- Serrimargo ater (Laporte, 1835) (South and Southeast Asia)
- Serrimargo bimaculatus Fedorenko, 2018 (Vietnam)
- Serrimargo grouvellei Bouchard, 1901 (Indonesia and Malaysia)
- Serrimargo guttiger (Schaum, 1860) (Indomalaya)
- Serrimargo impressifrons Fedorenko, 2018 (Sri Lanka)
- Serrimargo pahangensis Kirschenhofer, 2010 (Malaysia)
- Serrimargo schenklingi (Dupuis, 1912) (China, Taiwan, and Vietnam)
- Serrimargo verrucifer (Chaudoir, 1869) (Malaysia)
- Serrimargo vietnamensis Kirschenhofer, 2010 (Vietnam)
