= Oechalius =

Scientific classification
- Domain: Eukaryota
- Kingdom: Animalia
- Phylum: Arthropoda
- Class: Insecta
- Order: Coleoptera
- Suborder: Adephaga
- Family: Carabidae
- Tribe: Lebiini
- Subtribe: Agrina
- Genus: Oechalius; Liebke, 1935
- Species: O. ohausi

Binomial name
- Oechalius ohausi Liebke, 1935

Genus of beetles

Oechalius is a genus in the ground beetle family Carabidae. This genus has a single species, Oechalius ohausi. It is found in Brazil.
