= Lionedya =

Scientific classification
- Kingdom: Animalia
- Phylum: Arthropoda
- Class: Insecta
- Order: Coleoptera
- Suborder: Adephaga
- Family: Carabidae
- Tribe: Lebiini
- Subtribe: Lebiina
- Genus: Lionedya; Chaudoir, 1871
- Species: L. mongolica

Binomial name
- Lionedya mongolica (Motschulsky, 1850)

Genus of beetles

Lionedya is a genus in the ground beetle family Carabidae. This genus has a single species, Lionedya mongolica. It is found in Russia and Mongolia.
