= Carbonellia =

Scientific classification
- Domain: Eukaryota
- Kingdom: Animalia
- Phylum: Arthropoda
- Class: Insecta
- Order: Coleoptera
- Suborder: Adephaga
- Family: Carabidae
- Subfamily: Lebiinae
- Tribe: Lebiini
- Subtribe: Dromiusina
- Genus: Carbonellia; Mateu, 1968

Subgenera
- Carbonellia Mateu, 1968; Pseudocarbonellia Mateu, 1972

Synonyms
- Pseudocarbonellia Mateu, 1972

Genus of beetles

Carbonellia is a genus in the ground beetle family Carabidae. There are at least three described species in Carbonellia, found in South America.

== Species ==
These three species belong to the genus Carbonellia:

- Carbonellia atra (Mateu, 1972) (Colombia and Venezuela)
- Carbonellia jolyi Mateu, 1985 (Venezuela)
- Carbonellia platensis (Berg, 1883) (Argentina)
