= Oecornis =

Scientific classification
- Domain: Eukaryota
- Kingdom: Animalia
- Phylum: Arthropoda
- Class: Insecta
- Order: Coleoptera
- Suborder: Adephaga
- Family: Carabidae
- Subfamily: Lebiinae
- Tribe: Lebiini
- Subtribe: Somotrichina
- Genus: Oecornis; Britton, 1940

Genus of beetles

Oecornis is a genus in the beetle family Carabidae. There are at least two described species in Oecornis, found in Africa.

== Species ==
These two species belong to the genus Oecornis:

- Oecornis nidicola Britton, 1940 (Tanzania)
- Oecornis vadoni (Jeannel, 1949) (Madagascar)
