= Pachylebiodes =

Scientific classification
- Domain: Eukaryota
- Kingdom: Animalia
- Phylum: Arthropoda
- Class: Insecta
- Order: Coleoptera
- Suborder: Adephaga
- Family: Carabidae
- Tribe: Lebiini
- Subtribe: Lebiina
- Genus: Pachylebiodes; Mateu, 1972
- Species: P. vadoni

Binomial name
- Pachylebiodes vadoni (Jeannel, 1949)

Genus of beetles

Pachylebiodes is a genus in the ground beetle family Carabidae. This genus has a single species, Pachylebiodes vadoni. It is found in Madagascar.
