= Pectinitarsus =

Scientific classification
- Kingdom: Animalia
- Phylum: Arthropoda
- Class: Insecta
- Order: Coleoptera
- Suborder: Adephaga
- Family: Carabidae
- Tribe: Lebiini
- Subtribe: Pericalina
- Genus: Pectinitarsus; Fairmaire, 1881
- Species: P. holomelas

Binomial name
- Pectinitarsus holomelas Fairmaire, 1881

Genus of beetles

Pectinitarsus is a genus in the ground beetle family Carabidae. This genus has a single species, Pectinitarsus holomelas. It is found in Fiji.
