= Glyphodactyla =

Scientific classification
- Domain: Eukaryota
- Kingdom: Animalia
- Phylum: Arthropoda
- Class: Insecta
- Order: Coleoptera
- Suborder: Adephaga
- Family: Carabidae
- Subfamily: Lebiinae
- Tribe: Lebiini
- Subtribe: Pericalina
- Genus: Glyphodactyla; Chaudoir, 1837
- Species: G. femoralis

Binomial name
- Glyphodactyla femoralis Chaudoir, 1837

Genus of beetles

Glyphodactyla is a genus in the ground beetle family Carabidae. This genus has a single species, Glyphodactyla femoralis. It is found in South Africa.
