= Klepteromimus =

Scientific classification
- Kingdom: Animalia
- Phylum: Arthropoda
- Class: Insecta
- Order: Coleoptera
- Suborder: Adephaga
- Family: Carabidae
- Tribe: Lebiini
- Subtribe: Dromiusina
- Genus: Klepteromimus; Péringuey, 1898
- Species: K. ornatus

Binomial name
- Klepteromimus ornatus Péringuey, 1898

Genus of beetles

Klepteromimus is a genus in the ground beetle family Carabidae. This genus has a single species, Klepteromimus ornatus. It is found in South Africa.
