= Teiresia =

Scientific classification
- Domain: Eukaryota
- Kingdom: Animalia
- Phylum: Arthropoda
- Class: Insecta
- Order: Coleoptera
- Suborder: Adephaga
- Family: Carabidae
- Tribe: Lebiini
- Subtribe: Agrina
- Genus: Teiresia; Liebke, 1935
- Species: T. umbraculata

Binomial name
- Teiresia umbraculata Liebke, 1935

Genus of beetles

Teiresia umbraculata is a species of beetle in the family Carabidae, the only species in the genus Teiresia. It is found in Brazil.
