= Drymatus =

Scientific classification
- Kingdom: Animalia
- Phylum: Arthropoda
- Class: Insecta
- Order: Coleoptera
- Suborder: Adephaga
- Family: Carabidae
- Subfamily: Lebiinae
- Tribe: Lebiini
- Subtribe: Pericalina
- Genus: Drymatus; Motschulsky, 1862
- Species: D. tessellatus

Binomial name
- Drymatus tessellatus Motschulsky, 1862

Synonyms
- Parixenus Basilewsky, 1958

Genus of beetles

Drymatus is a genus in the ground beetle family Carabidae. This genus has a single species, Drymatus tessellatus. It is found in South Africa.
