= Lobodontus =

Scientific classification
- Domain: Eukaryota
- Kingdom: Animalia
- Phylum: Arthropoda
- Class: Insecta
- Order: Coleoptera
- Suborder: Adephaga
- Family: Carabidae
- Subfamily: Lebiinae
- Tribe: Lebiini
- Subtribe: Pericalina
- Genus: Lobodontus; Chaudoir, 1842

Genus of beetles

Lobodontus is a genus in the beetle family Carabidae. There are about 12 described species in Lobodontus, found in Africa.

== Species ==
These 12 species belong to the genus Lobodontus:

- Lobodontus ater Britton, 1937
- Lobodontus compressus (Murray, 1857)
- Lobodontus conjunctus Barker, 1919
- Lobodontus drumonti Facchini, 2017
- Lobodontus metallicus Burgeon, 1937
- Lobodontus murrayi Britton, 1937
- Lobodontus puncticollis Facchini, 2012
- Lobodontus taeniatus Basilewsky, 1970
- Lobodontus tanzaniensis Facchini, 2012
- Lobodontus trimaculatus Chaudoir, 1848
- Lobodontus trisignatus (Buquet, 1835)
- Lobodontus uninotatus Burgeon, 1937
