= Epikastea =

Scientific classification
- Domain: Eukaryota
- Kingdom: Animalia
- Phylum: Arthropoda
- Class: Insecta
- Order: Coleoptera
- Suborder: Adephaga
- Family: Carabidae
- Subfamily: Lebiinae
- Tribe: Lebiini
- Subtribe: Agrina
- Genus: Epikastea; Liebke, 1935

Genus of beetles

Epikastea is a genus in the ground beetle family Carabidae. There are about six described species in Epikastea, found in Peru, Ecuador, and Costa Rica.

== Species ==
These six species belong to the genus Epikastea:

- Epikastea biolat Erwin, 2004 (Peru)
- Epikastea grace Erwin, 2004 (Peru)
- Epikastea limonae Liebke, 1936 (Costa Rica)
- Epikastea mancocapac Erwin, 2004 (Peru)
- Epikastea piranha Erwin, 2004 (Ecuador)
- Epikastea poguei Erwin, 2004 (Peru)
