= Metablus =

Scientific classification
- Domain: Eukaryota
- Kingdom: Animalia
- Phylum: Arthropoda
- Class: Insecta
- Order: Coleoptera
- Suborder: Adephaga
- Family: Carabidae
- Subfamily: Lebiinae
- Tribe: Lebiini
- Subtribe: Lionychina
- Genus: Metablus; Jedlicka, 1958

Synonyms
- Parasyntomus Jeanne, 1972

Genus of beetles

Metablus is a genus in the ground beetle family Carabidae. There are at least two described species in Metablus.

== Species ==
These two species belong to the genus Metablus:

- Metablus paracenthesis (Motschulsky, 1839) (Palearctic)
- Metablus solskyi (Komarov, 1995) (Central Asia)
