= Pylartesius =

Scientific classification
- Domain: Eukaryota
- Kingdom: Animalia
- Phylum: Arthropoda
- Class: Insecta
- Order: Coleoptera
- Suborder: Adephaga
- Family: Carabidae
- Tribe: Lebiini
- Subtribe: Agrina
- Genus: Pylartesius; Liebke, 1939
- Species: P. strandi

Binomial name
- Pylartesius strandi Liebke, 1939

Genus of beetles

Pylartesius is a genus in the ground beetle family Carabidae. This genus has a single species, Pylartesius strandi. It is found in Argentina.
