= Coptoptera =

Scientific classification
- Domain: Eukaryota
- Kingdom: Animalia
- Phylum: Arthropoda
- Class: Insecta
- Order: Coleoptera
- Suborder: Adephaga
- Family: Carabidae
- Subfamily: Lebiinae
- Tribe: Lebiini
- Subtribe: Pericalina
- Genus: Coptoptera; Chaudoir, 1837

Genus of beetles

Coptoptera is a genus in the beetle family Carabidae. There are about nine described species in Coptoptera, found in South Africa and Mozambique.

== Species ==
These nine species belong to the genus Coptoptera:

- Coptoptera angusticollis Boheman, 1848 (South Africa)
- Coptoptera apicalis (Péringuey, 1896) (South Africa)
- Coptoptera brunnea Chaudoir, 1837 (South Africa)
- Coptoptera capicola Péringuey, 1896 (South Africa)
- Coptoptera longicollis Basilewsky, 1956 (South Africa)
- Coptoptera malvernensis (Barker, 1919) (South Africa)
- Coptoptera pugnax (Péringuey, 1896) (Mozambique)
- Coptoptera simplex (Péringuey, 1896) (South Africa)
- Coptoptera zuluana Basilewsky, 1956 (South Africa)
