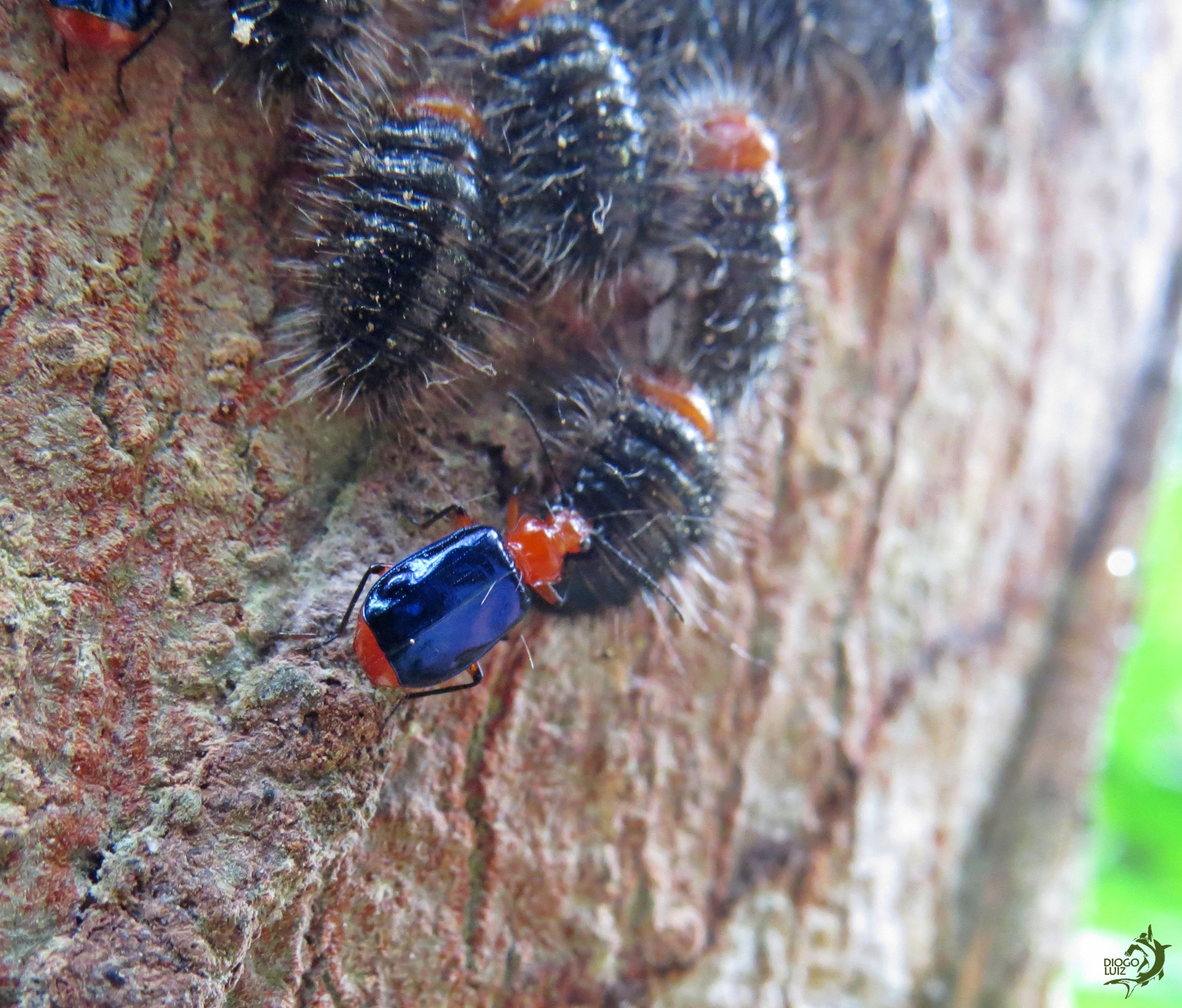
- Cryptobatis cyanoptera, Brazil

Scientific classification
- Domain: Eukaryota
- Kingdom: Animalia
- Phylum: Arthropoda
- Class: Insecta
- Order: Coleoptera
- Suborder: Adephaga
- Family: Carabidae
- Subfamily: Lebiinae
- Tribe: Lebiini
- Subtribe: Agrina
- Genus: Cryptobatis; Eschscholtz, 1829

Synonyms
- Aspasia Dejean, 1831; Cryptobasis; Entelechia Gistl, 1848

= Cryptobatis =

Genus of beetles

Cryptobatis is a genus in the ground beetle family Carabidae. There are about eight described species in Cryptobatis, found in Central and South America.

== Species ==
These eight species belong to the genus Cryptobatis:

- Cryptobatis brevipennis Chaudoir, 1877 (Brazil)
- Cryptobatis chontalensis Bates, 1883 (Guatemala)
- Cryptobatis cyanoptera (Dejean, 1825) (Brazil)
- Cryptobatis hexagona Putzeys, 1845 (Brazil)
- Cryptobatis inaequalis Chaudoir, 1877 (Brazil)
- Cryptobatis janthinipennis (Buquet, 1835) (French Guiana)
- Cryptobatis janthoptera (Reiche, 1842) (Colombia and Panama)
- Cryptobatis laticollis Brullé, 1838 (Bolivia)
