= Oreodicastes =

Scientific classification
- Domain: Eukaryota
- Kingdom: Animalia
- Phylum: Arthropoda
- Class: Insecta
- Order: Coleoptera
- Suborder: Adephaga
- Family: Carabidae
- Subfamily: Lebiinae
- Tribe: Lebiini
- Subtribe: Pericalina
- Genus: Oreodicastes; Maindron, 1905

Synonyms
- Oxyglossus Chaudoir, 1843

Genus of beetles

Oreodicastes is a genus in the ground beetle family Carabidae. There are about seven described species in Oreodicastes, found in Brazil.

== Species ==
These seven species belong to the genus Oreodicastes:

- Oreodicastes aeacus Shpeley & Ball, 2000
- Oreodicastes gounellei Maindron, 1906
- Oreodicastes minos Shpeley & Ball, 2000
- Oreodicastes rhadamanthus Shpeley & Ball, 2000
- Oreodicastes subcyanea (Chaudoir, 1843)
- Oreodicastes virginia Shpeley & Ball, 2001
- Oreodicastes zikani Shpeley & Ball, 2001
