= Lichnasthenus =

Scientific classification
- Kingdom: Animalia
- Phylum: Arthropoda
- Class: Insecta
- Order: Coleoptera
- Suborder: Adephaga
- Family: Carabidae
- Tribe: Lebiini
- Subtribe: Lichnasthenina
- Genus: Lichnasthenus; J.Thomson, 1858
- Species: L. armiventris

Binomial name
- Lichnasthenus armiventris J.Thomson, 1858

Synonyms
- Lichnastenus Thomson, 1858; Lichnasthenus Gemminger & Harold, 1868

Genus of beetles

Lichnasthenus is a genus in the ground beetle family Carabidae. This genus has a single species, Lichnasthenus armiventris. It is found in Africa.
