= Sugimotoa =

Scientific classification
- Kingdom: Animalia
- Phylum: Arthropoda
- Class: Insecta
- Order: Coleoptera
- Suborder: Adephaga
- Family: Carabidae
- Tribe: Lebiini
- Subtribe: Sugimotoina
- Genus: Sugimotoa; Habu, 1975
- Species: S. anthracoides

Binomial name
- Sugimotoa anthracoides (Straneo, 1967)

Genus of beetles

Sugimotoa is a genus in the beetle family Carabidae. This genus has a single species, Sugimotoa anthracoides. It is found in Japan, Philippines, the Solomon Islands, and Vanuatu.
