= Mascarenhia =

Scientific classification
- Kingdom: Animalia
- Phylum: Arthropoda
- Clade: Pancrustacea
- Class: Insecta
- Order: Coleoptera
- Suborder: Adephaga
- Family: Carabidae
- Tribe: Lebiini
- Subtribe: Pericalina
- Genus: Mascarenhia; Alluaud, 1933
- Species: M. subappendiculata

Binomial name
- Mascarenhia subappendiculata (Dejean, 1831)

Genus of beetles

Mascarenhia is a genus in the ground beetle family Carabidae. This genus has a single species, Mascarenhia subappendiculata. It is found in Mauritius.
