= Trichocoptodera =

Scientific classification
- Domain: Eukaryota
- Kingdom: Animalia
- Phylum: Arthropoda
- Class: Insecta
- Order: Coleoptera
- Suborder: Adephaga
- Family: Carabidae
- Subfamily: Lebiinae
- Tribe: Lebiini
- Subtribe: Pericalina
- Genus: Trichocoptodera; Louwerens, 1958

Genus of beetles

Trichocoptodera is a genus in the beetle family Carabidae. There are at least two described species in Trichocoptodera.

== Species ==
These two species belong to the genus Trichocoptodera:

- Trichocoptodera maculata Louwerens, 1958 (Indonesia)
- Trichocoptodera piligera (Chaudoir, 1883) (China, India, Myanmar, Laos, Vietnam, and Malaysia)
