= Speotarus =

Scientific classification
- Domain: Eukaryota
- Kingdom: Animalia
- Phylum: Arthropoda
- Class: Insecta
- Order: Coleoptera
- Suborder: Adephaga
- Family: Carabidae
- Subfamily: Lebiinae
- Tribe: Lebiini
- Subtribe: Agrina
- Genus: Speotarus; B.Moore, 1964

Genus of beetles

Speotarus is a genus in the beetle family Carabidae. There are at least two described species in Speotarus, found in Australia.

== Species ==
These two species belong to the genus Speotarus:

- Speotarus lucifugus B.Moore, 1964
- Speotarus opacipennis Baehr, 2020
