= Lelis (beetle) =

Scientific classification
- Domain: Eukaryota
- Kingdom: Animalia
- Phylum: Arthropoda
- Class: Insecta
- Order: Coleoptera
- Suborder: Adephaga
- Family: Carabidae
- Subfamily: Lebiinae
- Tribe: Lebiini
- Subtribe: Pericalina
- Genus: Lelis; Chaudoir, 1870

Genus of beetles

Lelis is a genus of Carabid Beetles in the beetle family Carabidae. There are about five described species in Lelis.

== Species ==
These five species belong to the genus Lelis:

- Lelis bicolor Chaudoir, 1870 (Mexico)
- Lelis obtusangula (Chaudoir, 1852) (Brazil)
- Lelis quadrisignata (Buquet, 1835) (French Guiana)
- Lelis rutila (Bates, 1869) (Colombia, Nicaragua, and Panama)
- Lelis viridipennis Chaudoir, 1870
