= Polyaulacus =

Scientific classification
- Domain: Eukaryota
- Kingdom: Animalia
- Phylum: Arthropoda
- Class: Insecta
- Order: Coleoptera
- Suborder: Adephaga
- Family: Carabidae
- Subfamily: Lebiinae
- Tribe: Lebiini
- Subtribe: Dromiusina
- Genus: Polyaulacus; Chaudoir, 1878

Genus of beetles

Polyaulacus is a genus in the ground beetle family Carabidae. There are at least four described species in Polyaulacus, found in Africa.

== Species ==
These four species belong to the genus Polyaulacus:

- Polyaulacus brunneus Chaudoir, 1878 (Africa)
- Polyaulacus kilimanus Alluaud, 1917 (Kenya, Tanzania)
- Polyaulacus nigrostriatus Basilewsky, 1947 (Tanzania)
- Polyaulacus pallidus Péringuey, 1908 (Africa)
