= Oxoides =

Scientific classification
- Domain: Eukaryota
- Kingdom: Animalia
- Phylum: Arthropoda
- Class: Insecta
- Order: Coleoptera
- Suborder: Adephaga
- Family: Carabidae
- Tribe: Lebiini
- Subtribe: Dromiusina
- Genus: Oxoides; Solier, 1849
- Species: O. obscurus

Binomial name
- Oxoides obscurus Solier, 1849

Genus of beetles

Oxoides is a genus in the ground beetle family Carabidae. This genus has a single species, Oxoides obscurus. It is found in Chile.
