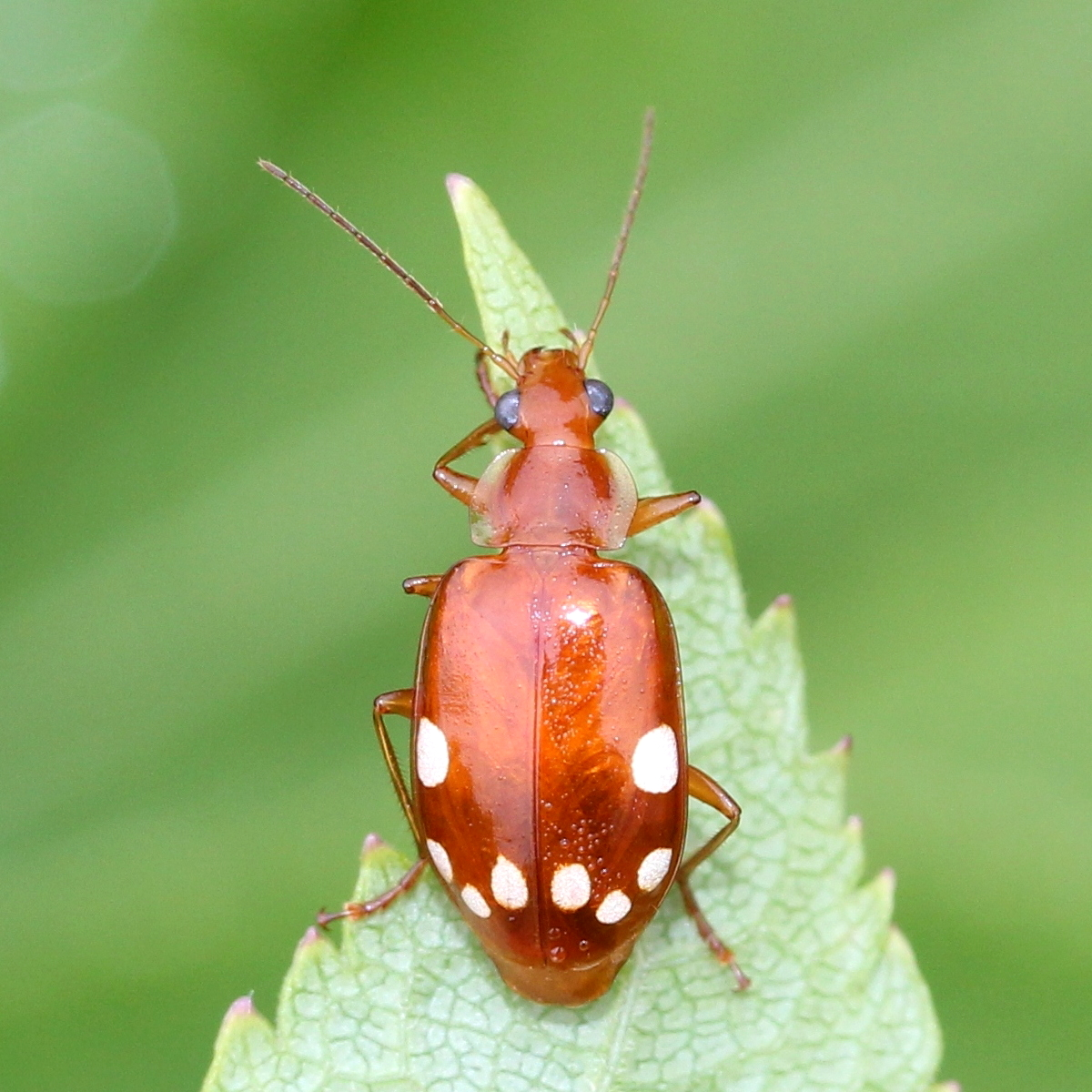
- Lebidia octoguttata

Scientific classification
- Domain: Eukaryota
- Kingdom: Animalia
- Phylum: Arthropoda
- Class: Insecta
- Order: Coleoptera
- Suborder: Adephaga
- Family: Carabidae
- Subfamily: Lebiinae
- Tribe: Lebiini
- Subtribe: Gallerucidiina
- Genus: Lebidia; A.Morawitz, 1862

= Lebidia =

Genus of beetles

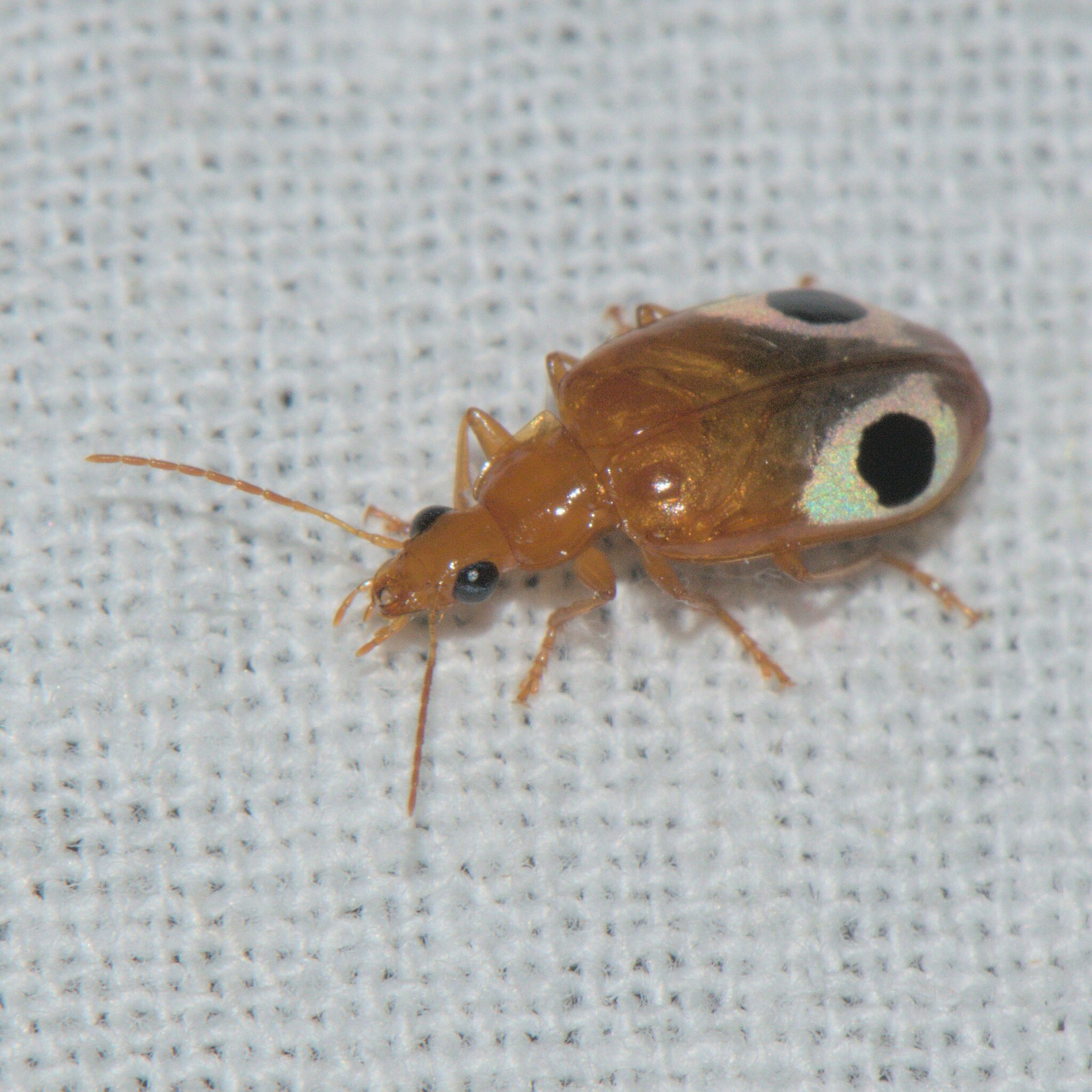
Lebidia bioculata, India

Lebidia is a genus in the ground beetle family Carabidae. There are about five described species in Lebidia.

== Species ==
These five species belong to the genus Lebidia:

- Lebidia bioculata A.Morawitz, 1863 (Asia)
- Lebidia dhankutani Kirschenhofer, 1994 (Nepal)
- Lebidia formosana Kano, 1929 (Taiwan)
- Lebidia octocelis Andrewes, 1924 (India)
- Lebidia octoguttata A.Morawitz, 1862 (Asia)
