= Sfitakantha =

Scientific classification
- Domain: Eukaryota
- Kingdom: Animalia
- Phylum: Arthropoda
- Class: Insecta
- Order: Coleoptera
- Suborder: Adephaga
- Family: Carabidae
- Subfamily: Lebiinae
- Tribe: Lebiini
- Subtribe: Pericalina
- Genus: Sfitakantha; Andrewes, 1919

Genus of beetles

Sfitakantha is a genus in the ground beetle family Carabidae. There are at least two described species in Sfitakantha, found in India and Southeast Asia.

== Species ==
These two species belong to the genus Sfitakantha:

- Sfitakantha impressa (Schmidt-Goebel, 1846) (India, Myanmar, Laos, Vietnam, Malaysia, Indonesia, Borneo)
- Sfitakantha reflexa Andrewes, 1937 (Indonesia)
