= Aspasiola =

Scientific classification
- Domain: Eukaryota
- Kingdom: Animalia
- Phylum: Arthropoda
- Class: Insecta
- Order: Coleoptera
- Suborder: Adephaga
- Family: Carabidae
- Subfamily: Lebiinae
- Tribe: Lebiini
- Subtribe: Agrina
- Genus: Aspasiola; Chaudoir, 1877

Genus of beetles

Aspasiola is a genus in the beetle family Carabidae. There are about eight described species in Aspasiola.

== Species ==
These eight species belong to the genus Aspasiola:

- Aspasiola bonita Erwin, 2004
- Aspasiola insignis Chaudoir, 1877 (Brazil)
- Aspasiola lemoides Bates, 1883 (Panama)
- Aspasiola osa Erwin, 2004
- Aspasiola rutilans Chaudoir, 1877 (Panama and Mexico)
- Aspasiola scutellaris Chaudoir, 1877 (Brazil)
- Aspasiola selva Erwin, 2004
- Aspasiola steineri Erwin, 2004
