= Pareurydera =

Scientific classification
- Domain: Eukaryota
- Kingdom: Animalia
- Phylum: Arthropoda
- Class: Insecta
- Order: Coleoptera
- Suborder: Adephaga
- Family: Carabidae
- Tribe: Lebiini
- Subtribe: Pericalina
- Genus: Pareurydera; Jeannel, 1949
- Species: P. spinosa

Binomial name
- Pareurydera spinosa (Gory, 1833)

Genus of beetles

Pareurydera is a genus in the ground beetle family Carabidae. This genus has a single species, Pareurydera spinosa. It is found in Madagascar.
