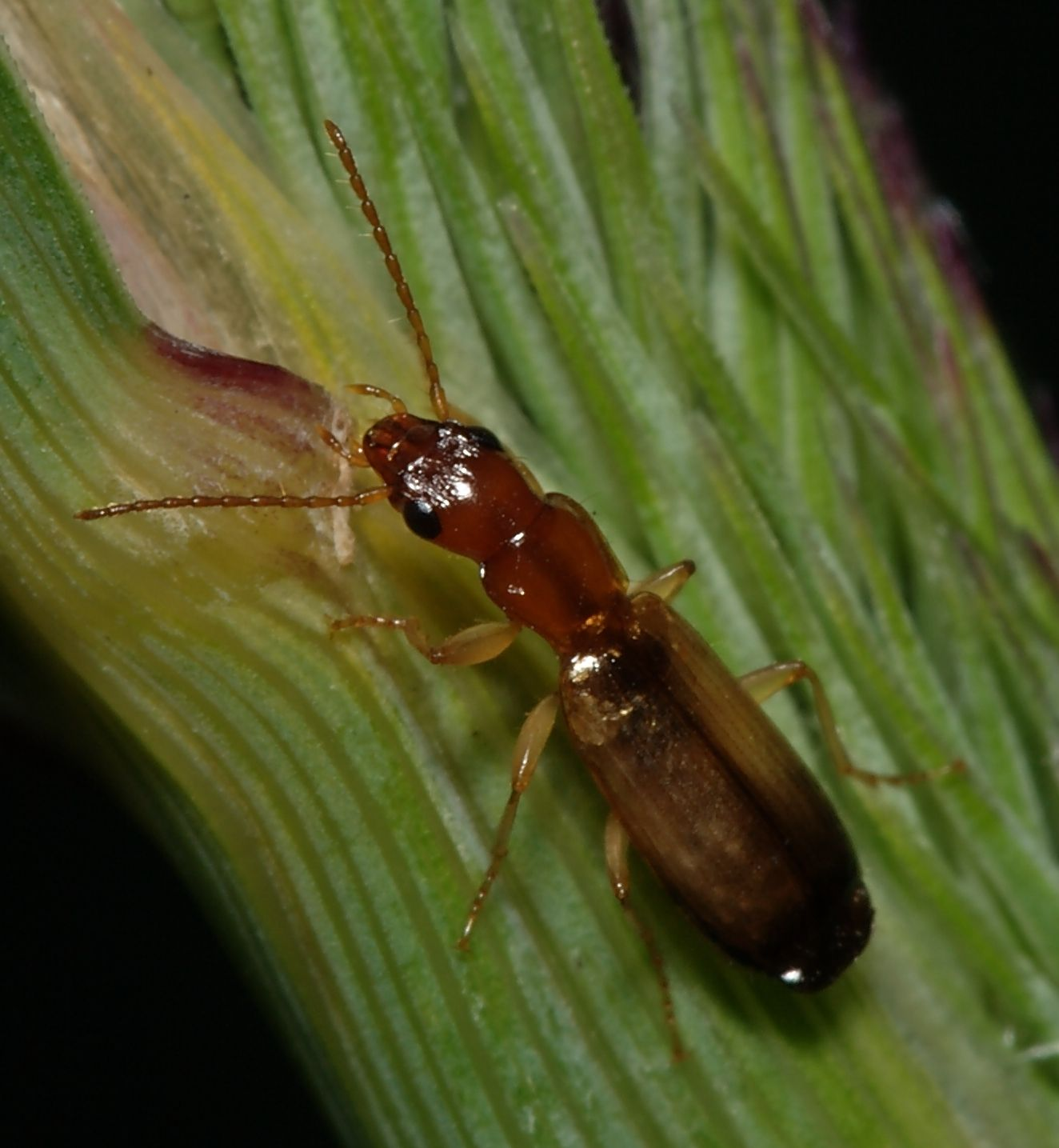
- Paradromius linearis

Scientific classification
- Domain: Eukaryota
- Kingdom: Animalia
- Phylum: Arthropoda
- Class: Insecta
- Order: Coleoptera
- Suborder: Adephaga
- Family: Carabidae
- Subfamily: Lebiinae
- Tribe: Lebiini
- Subtribe: Dromiusina
- Genus: Paradromius; Fowler, 1887

Subgenera
- Manodromius Reitter, 1905; Paradromius Fowler, 1887; Trichodromius Bedel, 1907

= Paradromius =

Genus of beetles

Paradromius is a genus in the beetle family Carabidae. There are more than 20 described species in Paradromius, found in North Africa, the Palearctic, and the Middle East.

== Species ==
These 25 species belong to the genus Paradromius:

- Paradromius amoenus (Wollaston, 1864) (the Canary Islands)
- Paradromius amplior Machado, 1992 (the Canary Islands)
- Paradromius arnoldii Kabak & Komarov, 1995 (Kyrgyzstan)
- Paradromius bermejoi (Mateu, 1956) (Western Sahara)
- Paradromius cylindraticollis (Peyerimhoff, 1927) (Egypt)
- Paradromius dendrobates (Bedel, 1900) (Algeria and Tunisia)
- Paradromius exornatus Machado, 1992 (the Canary Islands)
- Paradromius hariensis Machado, 1992 (the Canary Islands)
- Paradromius insularis (Wollaston, 1854) (Madeira and the Canary Islands)
- Paradromius iucundus Machado, 1992 (the Canary Islands)
- Paradromius kocheri Antoine, 1963 (Morocco)
- Paradromius linearis (Olivier, 1795) (Europe and Asia)
- Paradromius longiceps (Dejean, 1826) (Palearctic)
- Paradromius pilifer (Bedel, 1900) (Spain, Morocco, and Algeria)
- Paradromius proderus (Fairmaire, 1880) (Morocco)
- Paradromius puncticeps (Bedel, 1907) (Morocco and Algeria)
- Paradromius purpurarius Machado, 1992 (the Canary Islands)
- Paradromius ruficollis (Motschulsky, 1844) (Palearctic)
- Paradromius saharensis (Mateu, 1947) (Western Sahara)
- Paradromius scholzi Machado, 1992 (the Canary Islands)
- Paradromius strigifrons (Wollaston, 1865) (the Canary Islands)
- Paradromius sublinearis (Escalera, 1914) (Morocco and Western Sahara)
- Paradromius suturalis (Motschulsky, 1844) (Greece, Bulgaria, Kazakhstan, and Russia)
- Paradromius tamaranus Machado, 1992 (the Canary Islands)
- Paradromius vagepictus (Fairmaire, 1875) (North Africa and the Middle East)
