= Otoglossa =

Scientific classification
- Domain: Eukaryota
- Kingdom: Animalia
- Phylum: Arthropoda
- Class: Insecta
- Order: Coleoptera
- Suborder: Adephaga
- Family: Carabidae
- Subfamily: Lebiinae
- Tribe: Lebiini
- Subtribe: Agrina
- Genus: Otoglossa; Chaudoir, 1873

Synonyms
- Heraldinium Liebke, 1927

Genus of beetles

Otoglossa is a genus in the ground beetle family Carabidae. There are at least three described species in Otoglossa, found in Central and South America.

== Species ==
These three species belong to the genus Otoglossa:

- Otoglossa nevermanni (Liebke, 1927) (Costa Rica)
- Otoglossa subviolacea Mateu, 1961 (French Guiana, Brazil)
- Otoglossa tuberculosa Chaudoir, 1873 (Brazil)
