= Singiliomimus =

Scientific classification
- Kingdom: Animalia
- Phylum: Arthropoda
- Class: Insecta
- Order: Coleoptera
- Suborder: Adephaga
- Family: Carabidae
- Subfamily: Lebiinae
- Tribe: Lebiini
- Subtribe: Lionychina
- Genus: Singiliomimus; Péringuey, 1896

Genus of beetles

Singiliomimus is a genus in the ground beetle family Carabidae. There are at least two described species in Singiliomimus, found in Africa.

== Species ==
These two species belong to the genus Singiliomimus:

- Singiliomimus modestus Péringuey, 1896 (Angola, Namibia, South Africa)
- Singiliomimus posticalis Péringuey, 1896 (South Africa)
