= Minuphloeus =

Scientific classification
- Domain: Eukaryota
- Kingdom: Animalia
- Phylum: Arthropoda
- Class: Insecta
- Order: Coleoptera
- Suborder: Adephaga
- Family: Carabidae
- Tribe: Lebiini
- Subtribe: Pericalina
- Genus: Minuphloeus; Darlington, 1968
- Species: M. mixtus

Binomial name
- Minuphloeus mixtus Darlington, 1968

Genus of beetles

Minuphloeus is a genus in the ground beetle family Carabidae. This genus has a single species, Minuphloeus mixtus. It is found in Indonesia and New Guinea.
