= Cylindrocranius =

Scientific classification
- Domain: Eukaryota
- Kingdom: Animalia
- Phylum: Arthropoda
- Class: Insecta
- Order: Coleoptera
- Suborder: Adephaga
- Family: Carabidae
- Subfamily: Lebiinae
- Tribe: Lebiini
- Subtribe: Demetriadina
- Genus: Cylindrocranius; Chaudoir, 1878

Genus of beetles

Cylindrocranius is a genus in the ground beetle family Carabidae. There are about five described species in Cylindrocranius, found in Africa.

== Species ==
These five species belong to the genus Cylindrocranius:

- Cylindrocranius cribricollis (Fairmaire, 1904) (Madagascar)
- Cylindrocranius errans Péringuey, 1896 (Botswana, Namibia)
- Cylindrocranius risbeci Basilewsky, 1948 (Senegal/Gambia, Guinea)
- Cylindrocranius ruficollis Péringuey, 1896 (South Africa)
- Cylindrocranius rufulus Chaudoir, 1878 (Africa)
