= Sofota =

Scientific classification
- Domain: Eukaryota
- Kingdom: Animalia
- Phylum: Arthropoda
- Class: Insecta
- Order: Coleoptera
- Suborder: Adephaga
- Family: Carabidae
- Subfamily: Lebiinae
- Tribe: Lebiini
- Subtribe: Lebiina
- Genus: Sofota; Jedlicka, 1951

Genus of beetles

Sofota is a genus in the beetle family Carabidae. There are at least four described species in Sofota.

== Species ==
These four species belong to the genus Sofota:

- Sofota chuji Jedlicka, 1951 (Taiwan)
- Sofota nanlingensis D.Zhao & Tian, 2004 (China)
- Sofota nigra Tian & Chen, 2000 (China)
- Sofota perakensis Kirschenhofer, 2010 (Malaysia)
