= Amphimenoides =

Scientific classification
- Domain: Eukaryota
- Kingdom: Animalia
- Phylum: Arthropoda
- Class: Insecta
- Order: Coleoptera
- Suborder: Adephaga
- Family: Carabidae
- Tribe: Lebiini
- Genus: Amphimenoides; Kirschenhofer, 1999

Synonyms
- Gnopheroides Bousquet, 2002

Genus of beetles

Amphimenoides is a genus of ground beetles in the family Carabidae. There are at least two described species in Amphimenoides.

== Species ==
These two species belong to the genus Amphimenoides:

- Amphimenoides maculatus Kirschenhofer, 1999
- Amphimenoides pearsoni (Andrewes, 1923)
