= Cyanotarus =

Scientific classification
- Domain: Eukaryota
- Kingdom: Animalia
- Phylum: Arthropoda
- Class: Insecta
- Order: Coleoptera
- Suborder: Adephaga
- Family: Carabidae
- Subfamily: Lebiinae
- Tribe: Lebiini
- Subtribe: Agrina
- Genus: Cyanotarus; Reed, 1874

Genus of beetles

Cyanotarus is a genus in the ground beetle family Carabidae. There are at least two described species in Cyanotarus, found in Chile.

== Species ==
These two species belong to the genus Cyanotarus:

- Cyanotarus andinus (Germain, 1855)
- Cyanotarus foveolatus Chaudoir, 1876
