= Protoscalidion =

Protoscalidion Temporal range: Priabonian

Scientific classification
- Domain: Eukaryota
- Kingdom: Animalia
- Phylum: Arthropoda
- Class: Insecta
- Order: Coleoptera
- Suborder: Adephaga
- Family: Carabidae
- Subfamily: Lebiinae
- Tribe: Lebiini
- Genus: †Protoscalidion; L.Schaufuss, 1888
- Species: †P. rugiae

Binomial name
- †Protoscalidion rugiae L.Schaufuss, 1888

Genus of beetles

Protoscalidion is an extinct genus of ground beetles in the family Carabidae. This genus has a single species, Protoscalidion rugiae.
