= Mimodromius =

Scientific classification
- Domain: Eukaryota
- Kingdom: Animalia
- Phylum: Arthropoda
- Class: Insecta
- Order: Coleoptera
- Suborder: Adephaga
- Family: Carabidae
- Subfamily: Lebiinae
- Tribe: Lebiini
- Subtribe: Agrina
- Genus: Mimodromius; Chaudoir, 1873

Subgenera
- Cymindidius Chaudoir, 1876; Mimodromius Chaudoir, 1873

Genus of beetles

Mimodromius is a genus in the beetle family Carabidae. There are more than 40 described species in Mimodromius, found in South America.

== Species ==
These 43 species belong to the genus Mimodromius:

- Mimodromius altus Liebke, 1951 (Bolivia, Argentina, and Peru)
- Mimodromius aptinoides (Brullé, 1837) (Bolivia)
- Mimodromius bicolor (Brullé, 1837) (Chile and Peru)
- Mimodromius bolivianus Mateu, 1955 (Bolivia)
- Mimodromius bosqui Mateu, 1955 (Argentina)
- Mimodromius chilensis (Solier, 1849) (Chile)
- Mimodromius chopardi Mateu, 1955 (Chile)
- Mimodromius cruciger (Chaudoir, 1876) (Argentina)
- Mimodromius cyanipennis (Brullé, 1834) (Chile and Argentina)
- Mimodromius descendens Mateu, 1955
- Mimodromius elegantulus Mateu, 1964 (Chile)
- Mimodromius equatorianus Mateu, 1970 (Ecuador)
- Mimodromius fleissi Mateu, 1959 (Argentina)
- Mimodromius frigidus Germain, 1894 (Chile)
- Mimodromius fuscus Mateu, 1955 (Chile)
- Mimodromius gracilis Chaudoir, 1876 (Chile and Argentina)
- Mimodromius hassenteufeli Mateu, 1959 (Argentina)
- Mimodromius insperatus Mateu, 1986 (Chile)
- Mimodromius leleupi Mateu, 1972 (Ecuador)
- Mimodromius lepidus (Brullé, 1834) (Argentina)
- Mimodromius lividus Mateu, 1955 (Chile)
- Mimodromius lojanus Liebke, 1935 (Ecuador)
- Mimodromius martinezi (Mateu, 1959) (Argentina)
- Mimodromius metallicus Mateu, 1955 (Argentina)
- Mimodromius monrosi Mateu, 1955 (Argentina)
- Mimodromius negrei Mateu, 1960 (Peru)
- Mimodromius nigroeburneus Mateu, 1955 (Argentina)
- Mimodromius obscuripennis Chaudoir, 1876 (Chile)
- Mimodromius onorei Mateu, 1993 (Ecuador)
- Mimodromius orophilus Mateu, 1970 (Peru)
- Mimodromius parallelus Chaudoir, 1876 (Chile)
- Mimodromius peruvianus Mateu, 1955 (Peru)
- Mimodromius phaeoxanthus Chaudoir, 1876 (Argentina)
- Mimodromius philippii Reed, 1874 (Chile and Argentina)
- Mimodromius poggii Mateu, 1984 (Argentina)
- Mimodromius proseni Mateu, 1955 (Argentina)
- Mimodromius puncticeps Liebke, 1935 (Argentina)
- Mimodromius rugosus Mateu, 1955 (Argentina)
- Mimodromius solieri Csiki, 1932 (Chile and Argentina)
- Mimodromius straneoi Mateu, 1960 (Argentina)
- Mimodromius trivittis (Chaudoir, 1876) (Argentina)
- Mimodromius wagneri Liebke, 1935 (Argentina)
- Mimodromius weyrauchi Mateu, 1970 (Peru)
