= Dromidea =

Scientific classification
- Domain: Eukaryota
- Kingdom: Animalia
- Phylum: Arthropoda
- Class: Insecta
- Order: Coleoptera
- Suborder: Adephaga
- Family: Carabidae
- Subfamily: Lebiinae
- Tribe: Lebiini
- Subtribe: Agrina
- Genus: Dromidea; Perroud & Montrouzier, 1864

Synonyms
- Dendrobria Perroud & Montrouzier, 1864

Genus of beetles

Dromidea is a genus in the ground beetle family Carabidae. There are at least three described species in Dromidea, found in New Caledonia.

== Species ==
These three species belong to the genus Dromidea:

- Dromidea cyanoptera Fauvel, 1882
- Dromidea longiceps Fauvel, 1882
- Dromidea thomsoni Perroud & Montrouzier, 1864
