= Pontonoa =

Scientific classification
- Domain: Eukaryota
- Kingdom: Animalia
- Phylum: Arthropoda
- Class: Insecta
- Order: Coleoptera
- Suborder: Adephaga
- Family: Carabidae
- Tribe: Lebiini
- Subtribe: Agrina
- Genus: Pontonoa; Liebke, 1935
- Species: P. gounellei

Binomial name
- Pontonoa gounellei Liebke, 1935

Genus of beetles

Pontonoa is a genus in the ground beetle family Carabidae. This genus has a single species, Pontonoa gounellei. It is found in Brazil.
