= Apristomimus =

Apristomimus megacephalus

Scientific classification
- Kingdom: Animalia
- Phylum: Arthropoda
- Class: Insecta
- Order: Coleoptera
- Suborder: Adephaga
- Family: Carabidae
- Subfamily: Lebiinae
- Genus: Apristomimus; Mateu, 1969
- Species: A. megacephalus

Binomial name
- Apristomimus megacephalus Mateu, 1969

Genus of beetles

Apristomimus megacephalus is a species of beetle in the family Carabidae, the only species in the genus Apristomimus.
