= Tilius =

Scientific classification
- Kingdom: Animalia
- Phylum: Arthropoda
- Class: Insecta
- Order: Coleoptera
- Suborder: Adephaga
- Family: Carabidae
- Subfamily: Lebiinae
- Genus: Tilius; Chaudoir, 1876

Genus of beetles

Tilius is a genus of beetles in the family Carabidae, containing the following species:

- Tilius holosericeus (Chaudoir, 1850) (Nepal and India)
- Tilius lacunosus Basilewsky, 1948 (Cameroon)
- Tilius obscurellus (Dejean, 1831) (Africa)
- Tilius quadriimpressus (Fairmaire, 1898) (Mauretania, Gabon, and Madagascar)
- Tilius subsericeus Chaudoir, 1876 (Africa)
- Tilius sulcatus Alluaud, 1932 (Madagascar)
