= Oxyodontus =

Scientific classification
- Kingdom: Animalia
- Phylum: Arthropoda
- Class: Insecta
- Order: Coleoptera
- Suborder: Adephaga
- Family: Carabidae
- Subfamily: Lebiinae
- Genus: Oxyodontus; Chaudoir, 1869

Genus of beetles

Oxyodontus is a genus of beetles in the family Carabidae, containing O. piliferus (described by Louwerens in 1952) and O. tripunctatus (Chaudoir, 1869).
