= Allophanes =

Scientific classification
- Kingdom: Animalia
- Phylum: Arthropoda
- Class: Insecta
- Order: Coleoptera
- Suborder: Adephaga
- Family: Carabidae
- Subfamily: Lebiinae
- Genus: Allophanes; Andrewes, 1939

Genus of beetles

Allophanes is a genus of beetles in the family Carabidae, containing the following species:

- Allophanes auripennis (Chaudoir, 1877)
- Allophanes drescheri Louwerens, 1952
- Allophanes limbipennis (Chaudoir, 1877)
- Allophanes mundus (Andrewes, 1931)
