= Amelus =

Amelus nigripennis

Scientific classification
- Kingdom: Animalia
- Phylum: Arthropoda
- Class: Insecta
- Order: Coleoptera
- Suborder: Adephaga
- Family: Carabidae
- Subfamily: Lebiinae
- Genus: Amelus; Chaudoir, 1872
- Species: A. nigripennis

Binomial name
- Amelus nigripennis (Gory, 1833)

Genus of beetles

Amelus nigripennis is a species of beetle in the family Carabidae, the only species in the genus Amelus.
