= Velindopsis =

Scientific classification
- Kingdom: Animalia
- Phylum: Arthropoda
- Class: Insecta
- Order: Coleoptera
- Suborder: Adephaga
- Family: Carabidae
- Subfamily: Lebiinae
- Genus: Velindopsis; Burgeon, 1937

Genus of beetles

Velindopsis is a genus of beetles in the family Carabidae, containing the following species:

- Velindopsis madecassa Jeannel, 1949
- Velindopsis panagaeoides Burgeon, 1937
- Velindopsis pauliani Basilewsky, 1953
