= Xenodromius =

Scientific classification
- Kingdom: Animalia
- Phylum: Arthropoda
- Class: Insecta
- Order: Coleoptera
- Suborder: Adephaga
- Family: Carabidae
- Subfamily: Lebiinae
- Genus: Xenodromius; Bates, 1891

Genus of beetles

Xenodromius is a genus of beetles in the family Carabidae, containing the following species:

- Xenodromius brachinoides Mateu, 1976
- Xenodromius curtulus Mateu, 1976
- Xenodromius flohri Bates, 1891
- Xenodromius microphthalmus Mateu, 1976
- Xenodromius reyesi Mateu, 1976
- Xenodromius testaceus Mateu, 1976
