= Brachyctis =

Brachyctis rugulosa

Scientific classification
- Kingdom: Animalia
- Phylum: Arthropoda
- Class: Insecta
- Order: Coleoptera
- Suborder: Adephaga
- Family: Carabidae
- Subfamily: Lebiinae
- Genus: Brachyctis; Chaudoir, 1869
- Species: B. rugulosa

Binomial name
- Brachyctis rugulosa Chaudoir, 1869

Genus of beetles

Brachyctis rugulosa is a species of beetle in the family Carabidae, the only species in the genus Brachyctis.
