= Xenitenopsis =

Xenitenopsis jacoti

Scientific classification
- Kingdom: Animalia
- Phylum: Arthropoda
- Class: Insecta
- Order: Coleoptera
- Suborder: Adephaga
- Family: Carabidae
- Subfamily: Lebiinae
- Genus: Xenitenopsis; Basilewsky, 1956
- Species: X. jacoti

Binomial name
- Xenitenopsis jacoti Basilewsky, 1956

Genus of beetles

Xenitenopsis jacoti is a species of beetle in the family Carabidae, the only species in the genus Xenitenopsis.
