= Omobrus =

Scientific classification
- Kingdom: Animalia
- Phylum: Arthropoda
- Class: Insecta
- Order: Coleoptera
- Suborder: Adephaga
- Family: Carabidae
- Subfamily: Lebiinae
- Genus: Omobrus; Andrewes, 1930

Genus of beetles

Omobrus is a genus of beetles in the family Carabidae, containing the following species:

- Omobrus pilosus Louwerens, 1952
- Omobrus praetextus Andrewes, 1930
- Omobrus punctulatus Jedlicka, 1935
