= Calleidomorpha =

Calleidomorpha nigroaenea

Scientific classification
- Kingdom: Animalia
- Phylum: Arthropoda
- Class: Insecta
- Order: Coleoptera
- Suborder: Adephaga
- Family: Carabidae
- Subfamily: Lebiinae
- Genus: Calleidomorpha; Motschulsky, 1855
- Species: C. nigroaenea

Binomial name
- Calleidomorpha nigroaenea Motschulsky, 1855

Genus of beetles

Calleidomorpha nigroaenea is a species of beetle in the family Carabidae, the only species in the genus Calleidomorpha.
