= Pseudotrechus =

Scientific classification
- Domain: Eukaryota
- Kingdom: Animalia
- Phylum: Arthropoda
- Class: Insecta
- Order: Coleoptera
- Suborder: Adephaga
- Family: Carabidae
- Genus: Pseudotrechus; Rosenhauer, 1856
- Species: P. mutilatus

Binomial name
- Pseudotrechus mutilatus Rosenhauer, 1856

Genus of beetles

Pseudotrechus mutilatus is a species of beetle in the family Carabidae, the only species in the genus Pseudotrechus.
