= Trymosternus =

Scientific classification
- Kingdom: Animalia
- Phylum: Arthropoda
- Class: Insecta
- Order: Coleoptera
- Suborder: Adephaga
- Family: Carabidae
- Subfamily: Lebiinae
- Genus: Trymosternus; Chaudoir, 1873

Genus of beetles

Trymosternus is a genus of beetles in the family Carabidae, containing the following species:

- Trymosternus acutangulus Mateu, 1963
- Trymosternus ariasi Bolivar Y Pieltain, 1914
- Trymosternus bolivari Mateu, 1952
- Trymosternus cobosi Mateu, 1952
- Trymosternus colombati Antoine, 1934
- Trymosternus cordatus (Rambur, 1837)
- Trymosternus dilaticollis (Lucas, 1846)
- Trymosternus negrei Mateu, 1952
- Trymosternus onychinus (Dejean, 1825)
- Trymosternus refleximargo Chaudoir, 1873
- Trymosternus truncatus (Rambur, 1837)
- Trymosternus urcitanus Mateu, 1963
