= Velindomimus =

Velindomimus fasciatus

Scientific classification
- Kingdom: Animalia
- Phylum: Arthropoda
- Class: Insecta
- Order: Coleoptera
- Suborder: Adephaga
- Family: Carabidae
- Subfamily: Lebiinae
- Genus: Velindomimus; Jeannel, 1955
- Species: V. fasciatus

Binomial name
- Velindomimus fasciatus Jeannel, 1955

Genus of beetles

Velindomimus fasciatus is a species of beetle in the family Carabidae, the only species in the genus Velindomimus.
