= Apterodromites =

Apterodromites saizi

Scientific classification
- Kingdom: Animalia
- Phylum: Arthropoda
- Class: Insecta
- Order: Coleoptera
- Suborder: Adephaga
- Family: Carabidae
- Subfamily: Lebiinae
- Genus: Apterodromites; Mateu, 1976
- Species: A. saizi

Binomial name
- Apterodromites saizi Mateu, 1976

Genus of beetles

Apterodromites saizi is a species of beetle in the family Carabidae, the only species in the genus Apterodromites.
