= Barrymooreana =

Barrymooreana quadrimaculata

Scientific classification
- Domain: Eukaryota
- Kingdom: Animalia
- Phylum: Arthropoda
- Class: Insecta
- Order: Coleoptera
- Suborder: Adephaga
- Family: Carabidae
- Genus: Barrymooreana; Baehr, 1997
- Species: B. quadrimaculata

Binomial name
- Barrymooreana quadrimaculata Baehr, 1987

Genus of beetles

Barrymooreana quadrimaculata is a species of beetle in the family Carabidae, the only species in the genus Barrymooreana.
