= Trichidema =

Trichidema capense

Scientific classification
- Kingdom: Animalia
- Phylum: Arthropoda
- Class: Insecta
- Order: Coleoptera
- Suborder: Adephaga
- Family: Carabidae
- Subfamily: Lebiinae
- Genus: Trichidema; Basilewsky, 1956
- Species: T. capense

Binomial name
- Trichidema capense Basilewsky, 1956

Genus of beetles

Trichidema capense is a species of beetle in the family Carabidae, the only species in the genus Trichidema.
