= Velinda =

Velinda lirata

Scientific classification
- Kingdom: Animalia
- Phylum: Arthropoda
- Class: Insecta
- Order: Coleoptera
- Suborder: Adephaga
- Family: Carabidae
- Subfamily: Lebiinae
- Genus: Velinda; Andrewes, 1921
- Species: V. lirata

Binomial name
- Velinda lirata Andrewes, 1921

Genus of beetles

Velinda lirata is a species of beetle in the family Carabidae, the only species in the genus Velinda.
