= Astastus =

Scientific classification
- Kingdom: Animalia
- Phylum: Arthropoda
- Class: Insecta
- Order: Coleoptera
- Suborder: Adephaga
- Family: Carabidae
- Subfamily: Lebiinae
- Genus: Astastus; Peringuey, 1896

Genus of beetles

Astastus is a genus of beetles in the family Carabidae, containing the following species:

- Astastus debilis Peringuey, 1896
- Astastus quadrimaculatus Basilewsky, 1958
