= Allardina =

Allardina katangana

Scientific classification
- Kingdom: Animalia
- Phylum: Arthropoda
- Class: Insecta
- Order: Coleoptera
- Suborder: Adephaga
- Family: Carabidae
- Subfamily: Lebiinae
- Genus: Allardina; Basilewsky, 1963
- Species: A. katangana

Binomial name
- Allardina katangana Basilewsky, 1963

Genus of beetles

Allardina katangana is a species of beetle in the family Carabidae, the only species in the genus Allardina.
