= Xenitenus =

Scientific classification
- Kingdom: Animalia
- Phylum: Arthropoda
- Class: Insecta
- Order: Coleoptera
- Suborder: Adephaga
- Family: Carabidae
- Subfamily: Lebiinae
- Genus: Xenitenus; Peringuey, 1896

Genus of beetles

Xenitenus is a genus of beetles in the family Carabidae, containing the following species:

- Xenitenus andringitranus Mateu, 1975
- Xenitenus bambuseti Basilewsky, 1958
- Xenitenus brincki Basilewsky, 1958
- Xenitenus debilis Peringuey, 1896
- Xenitenus dilucidus Peringuey, 1896
- Xenitenus inornatus Peringuey, 1896
- Xenitenus katanganus Basilewsky, 1958
- Xenitenus lateripictus (Motschulsky, 1864)
- Xenitenus limbatus Peringuey, 1896
- Xenitenus longevittatus Basilewsky, 1958
- Xenitenus lucidus Basilewsky, 1988
- Xenitenus maurus (Motschulsky, 1864)
- Xenitenus natalicus Peringuey, 1904
- Xenitenus occipitalis (Jeannel, 1949)
- Xenitenus ornatellus Peringuey, 1896
- Xenitenus tesselatus Peringuey, 1896
