= Falsodromius =

Scientific classification
- Domain: Eukaryota
- Kingdom: Animalia
- Phylum: Arthropoda
- Class: Insecta
- Order: Coleoptera
- Suborder: Adephaga
- Family: Carabidae
- Genus: Falsodromius; Mateu, 1976
- Species: F. erythropus

Binomial name
- Falsodromius erythropus (Solier, 1849)

Genus of beetles

Falsodromius erythropus is a species of beetle in the family Carabidae, the only species in the genus Falsodromius.
