= Setolebia =

Scientific classification
- Domain: Eukaryota
- Kingdom: Animalia
- Phylum: Arthropoda
- Class: Insecta
- Order: Coleoptera
- Suborder: Adephaga
- Family: Carabidae
- Subtribe: Lebiina
- Genus: Setolebia; Jedlička, 1941

Type species
- Lebia sterbai Jedlička, 1931

Genus of beetles

Setolebia is a genus of beetles in the family Carabidae, containing the following species as of 2017:

- Setolebia caligata (Bates, 1889) — Russia (Far East), China (Jiangxi)
- Setolebia kmecoi Kirschenhofer, 2012 — China (Yunnan)
- Setolebia legorskyi Kirschenhofer, 2012 — China (Yunnan)
- Setolebia nubatama Habu, 1957 — Japan
- Setolebia sterbai (Jedlička, 1931) — China (Yunnan)
