= Auchmerus =

Auchmerus trachys

Scientific classification
- Kingdom: Animalia
- Phylum: Arthropoda
- Class: Insecta
- Order: Coleoptera
- Suborder: Adephaga
- Family: Carabidae
- Subfamily: Lebiinae
- Genus: Auchmerus; Andrewes, 1930
- Species: A. trachys

Binomial name
- Auchmerus trachys Andrewes, 1929

Genus of beetles

Auchmerus trachys is a species of beetle in the family Carabidae, the only species in the genus Auchmerus.
