= Brigalowia =

Brigalowia setifera

Scientific classification
- Kingdom: Animalia
- Phylum: Arthropoda
- Class: Insecta
- Order: Coleoptera
- Suborder: Adephaga
- Family: Carabidae
- Subfamily: Lebiinae
- Genus: Brigalowia; Baehr, 2006
- Species: B. setifera

Binomial name
- Brigalowia setifera Baehr, 2006

Genus of beetles

Brigalowia setifera is a species of beetle in the family Carabidae, the only species in the genus Brigalowia.
