= Lebidema =

Scientific classification
- Kingdom: Animalia
- Phylum: Arthropoda
- Class: Insecta
- Order: Coleoptera
- Suborder: Adephaga
- Family: Carabidae
- Subfamily: Lebiinae
- Genus: Lebidema; Motschulsky, 1864

Genus of beetles

Lebidema is a genus of beetles in the family Carabidae, containing the following species:

- Lebidema davicorne (Murray, 1857)
- Lebidema pellucidum Britton, 1940
- Lebidema ruandense Burgeon, 1937
