= Paulianites =

Paulianites nidicola

Scientific classification
- Kingdom: Animalia
- Phylum: Arthropoda
- Class: Insecta
- Order: Coleoptera
- Suborder: Adephaga
- Family: Carabidae
- Subfamily: Lebiinae
- Genus: Paulianites; Jeannel, 1959
- Species: P. nidicola

Binomial name
- Paulianites nidicola Jeannel, 1949

Genus of beetles

Paulianites nidicola is a species of beetle in the family Carabidae, the only species in the genus Paulianites.
