= Antimerina =

Antimerina elegans

Scientific classification
- Kingdom: Animalia
- Phylum: Arthropoda
- Class: Insecta
- Order: Coleoptera
- Suborder: Adephaga
- Family: Carabidae
- Subfamily: Lebiinae
- Genus: Antimerina; Alluaud, 1898
- Species: A. elegans

Binomial name
- Antimerina elegans Alluaud, 1897

Genus of beetles

Antimerina elegans is a species of beetle in the family Carabidae, the only species in the genus Antimerina.
