= Vianasia =

Scientific classification
- Kingdom: Animalia
- Phylum: Arthropoda
- Class: Insecta
- Order: Coleoptera
- Suborder: Adephaga
- Family: Carabidae
- Subfamily: Lebiinae
- Genus: Vianasia; Mateu, 1955

Genus of beetles

Vianasia is a genus of beetles in the family Carabidae, containing the following species:

- Vianasia guttula (Solier, 1849)
- Vianasia nigrotestacea (Solier, 1849)
- Vianasia opacicollis (Chaudoir, 1876)
- Vianasia rugaticollis (Mateu, 1976)
