= Coptopterina =

Scientific classification
- Kingdom: Animalia
- Phylum: Arthropoda
- Class: Insecta
- Order: Coleoptera
- Suborder: Adephaga
- Family: Carabidae
- Subfamily: Lebiinae
- Genus: Coptopterina; Basilewsky, 1956

Genus of beetles

Coptopterina is a genus of beetles in the family Carabidae, containing the following species:

- Coptopterina johnstoni (Alluaud, 1917)
- Coptopterina limbipennis (G. Muller, 1942)
- Coptopterina phantasma (Peringuey, 1899)
- Coptopterina punctatostriata (Peringuey, 1896)
- Coptopterina scapulofugiens (Basilewsky, 1950)
- Coptopterina scutellaris (Peringuey, 1896)
- Coptopterina tenella (Boheman, 1848)
