= Allophanopsis =

Allophanopsis emarginata

Scientific classification
- Kingdom: Animalia
- Phylum: Arthropoda
- Class: Insecta
- Order: Coleoptera
- Suborder: Adephaga
- Family: Carabidae
- Subfamily: Lebiinae
- Genus: Allophanopsis; Louwerens, 1952
- Species: A. emarginata

Binomial name
- Allophanopsis emarginata Louwerens, 1952

Genus of beetles

Allophanopsis emarginata is a species of beetle in the family Carabidae, the only species in the genus Allophanopsis.
