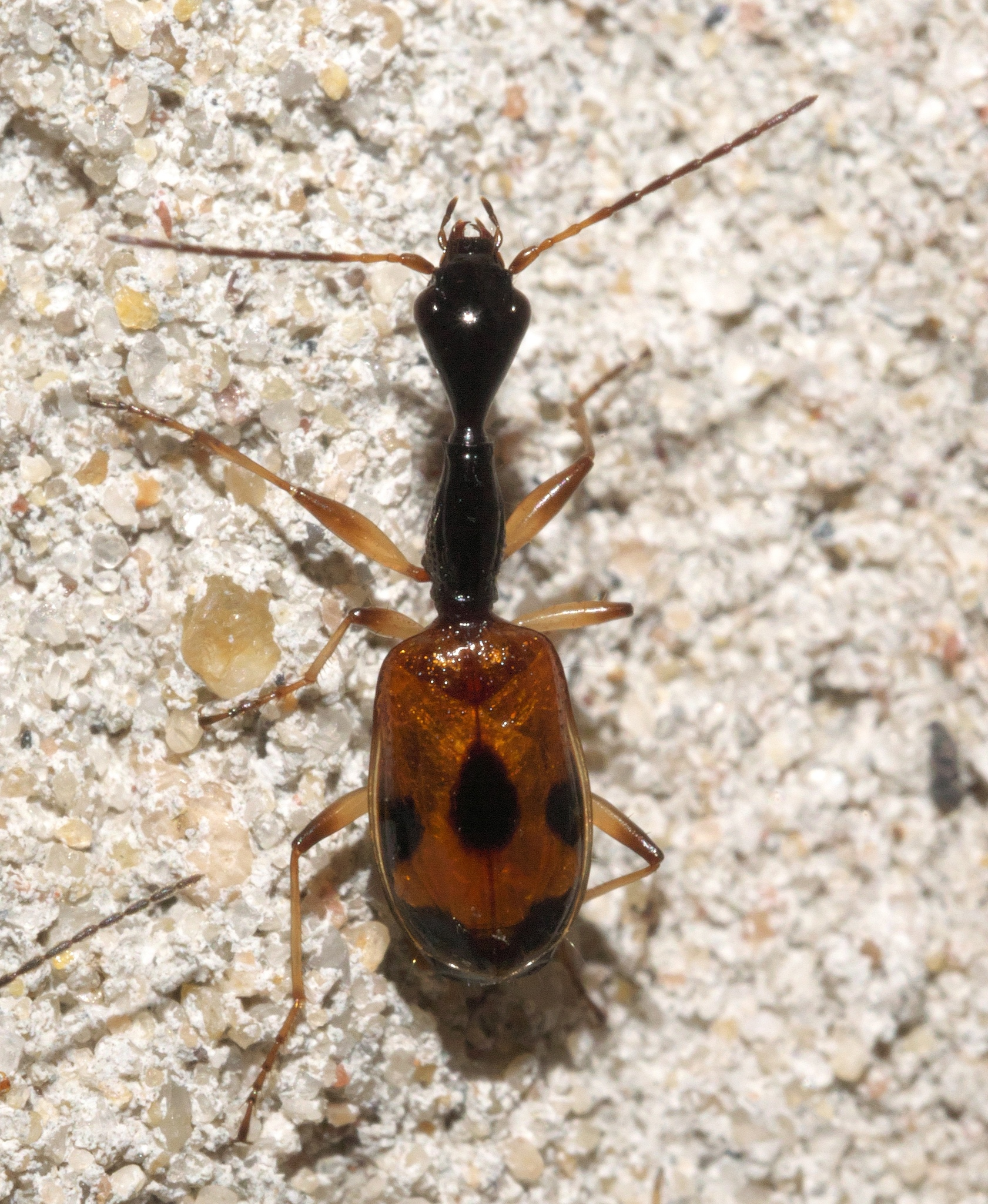
- Colliuris pensylvanica, Oklahoma

Scientific classification
- Kingdom: Animalia
- Phylum: Arthropoda
- Class: Insecta
- Order: Coleoptera
- Suborder: Adephaga
- Family: Carabidae
- Subfamily: Lebiinae
- Tribe: Odacanthini; Laporte, 1834

Subtribes
- Actenonycina Bates, 1871; Homethina Liebherr, 2016; Odacanthina Laporte, 1834; Pentagonicina Bates, 1873

= Odacanthini =

Tribe of ground beetles

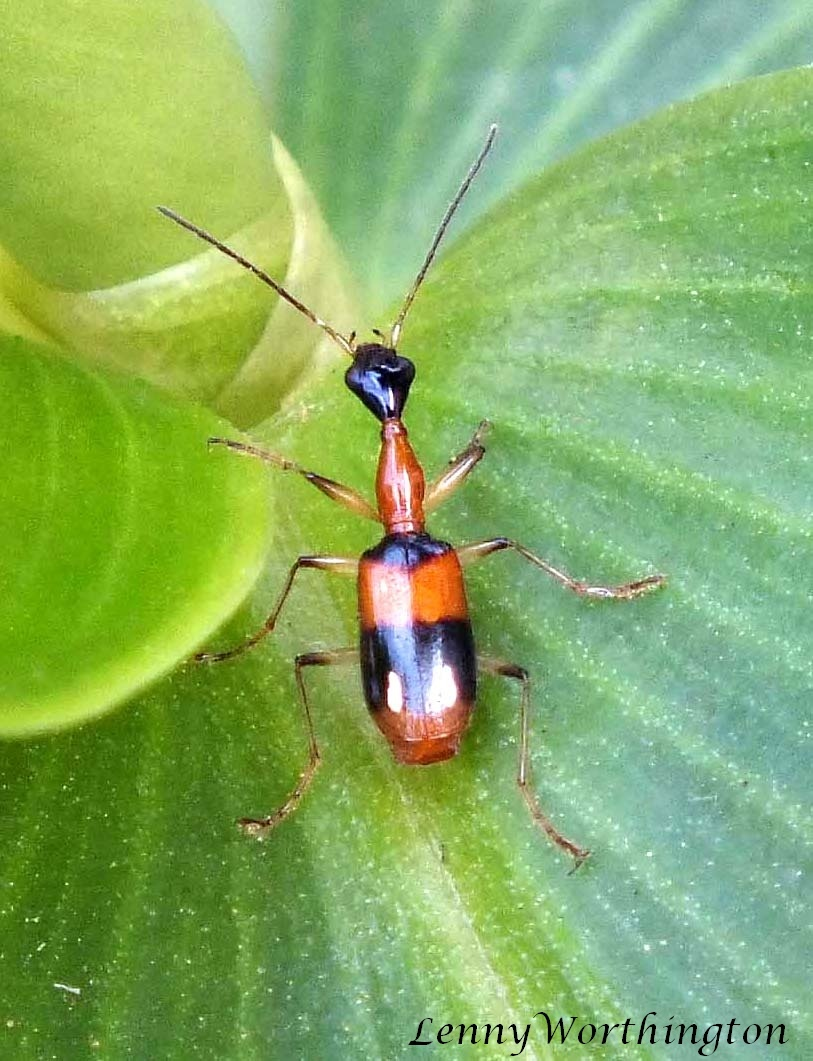
Ophionea ishiii, Thailand

Odacanthini is a tribe of ground beetles in the family Carabidae. There are more than 40 genera and 680 described species in Odacanthini.

== Genera ==
These 43 genera belong to the tribe Odacanthini:

- Actenonyx White, 1846
- Aeolodermus Andrewes, 1929
- Anasis Laporte, 1867
- Andrewesia Liebke, 1938
- Arame Andrewes, 1919
- Archicolliuris Liebke, 1931
- Asios Liebke, 1933
- Aulacolius Sloane, 1923
- Basistichus Sloane, 1917
- Clarencia Sloane, 1917
- Colliuris DeGeer, 1774
- Crassacantha Baehr, 1995
- Cryptocolliuris Basilewsky, 1955
- Cyphocoleus Chaudoir, 1877
- Deipyrodes Bousquet, 2002
- Dicraspeda Chaudoir, 1863
- Diplacanthogaster Liebke, 1932
- Dobodura Darlington, 1968
- Erectocolliuris Liebke, 1931
- Eucolliuris Liebke, 1931
- Eudalia Laporte, 1867
- Gestroania Liebke, 1938
- Giachinoana Baehr, 2003
- Homethes Newman, 1842
- Lachnothorax Motschulsky, 1862
- Lasiocera Dejean, 1831
- Mimocolliuris Liebke, 1933
- Myrmecodemus Sloane, 1923
- Neoeudalia Baehr, 2005
- Odacantha Paykull, 1798
- Ophionea Klug, 1821
- Parascopodes Darlington, 1968
- Pentagonica Schmidt-Goebel, 1846
- Polydamasium Liebke, 1938
- Porocara Sloane, 1917
- Protocolliuris Liebke, 1931
- Quammenis Erwin, 2000
- Renneria Baehr, 1999
- Scopodes Erichson, 1842
- Smeringocera Chaudoir, 1863
- Stenidia Brullé, 1834
- Stenocheila Laporte, 1832
- Tricharnhemia Baehr, 2009
