= A. bembidioides =

A. bembidioides may refer to:

- Abacetus bembidioides, a ground beetle
- Actenonyx bembidioides, a ground beetle found in New Zealand
