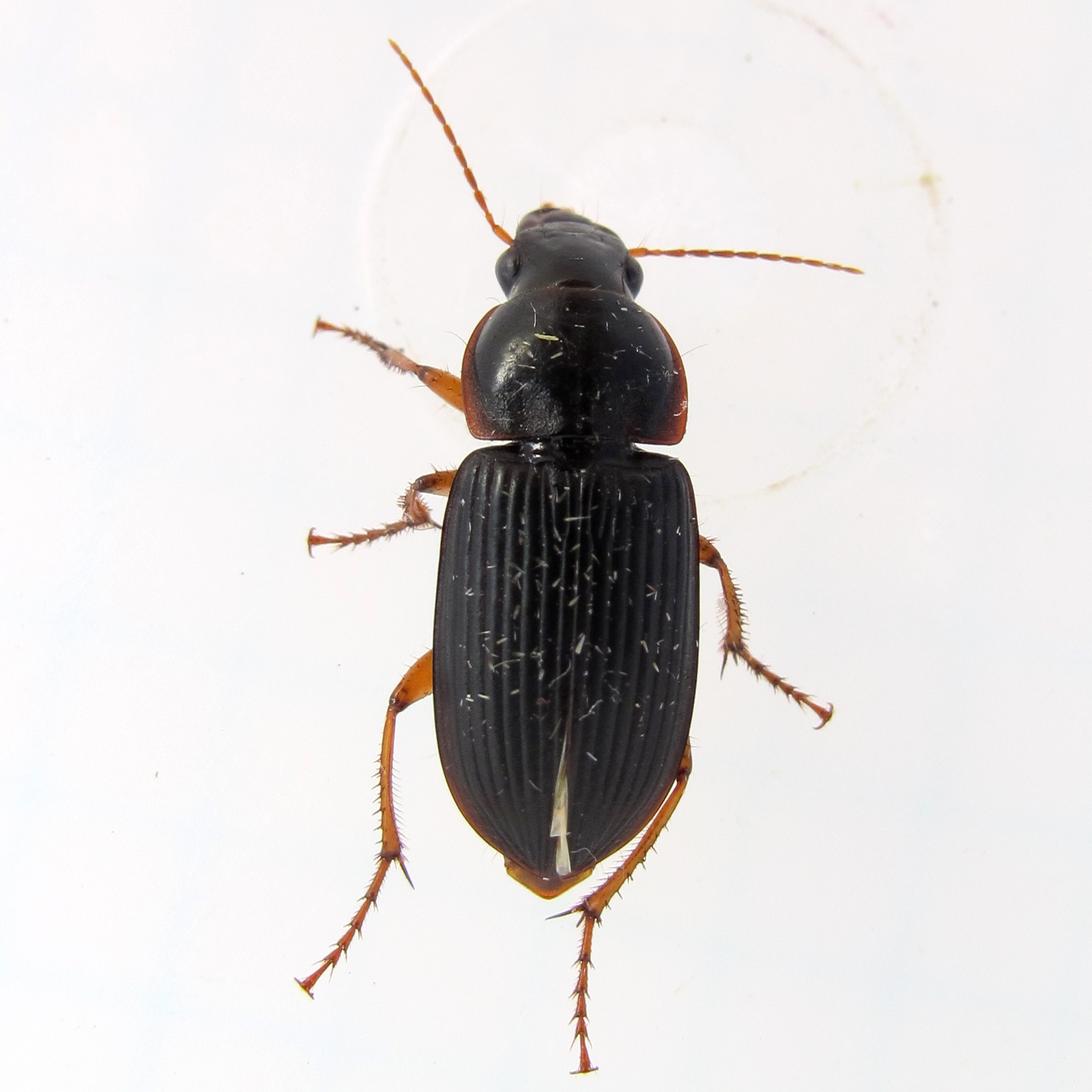
- Harpalus pensylvanicus, a member of the Harpalinae subfamily.

Scientific classification
- Kingdom: Animalia
- Phylum: Arthropoda
- Clade: Pancrustacea
- Class: Insecta
- Order: Coleoptera
- Suborder: Adephaga
- Family: Carabidae
- Subfamily: Harpalinae; Linnaeus, 1758

= Harpalinae =

Subfamily of insects in the Ground beetle family (Carabidae)

Harpalinae is the largest subfamily of ground beetles, containing more than 19,000 species worldwide.

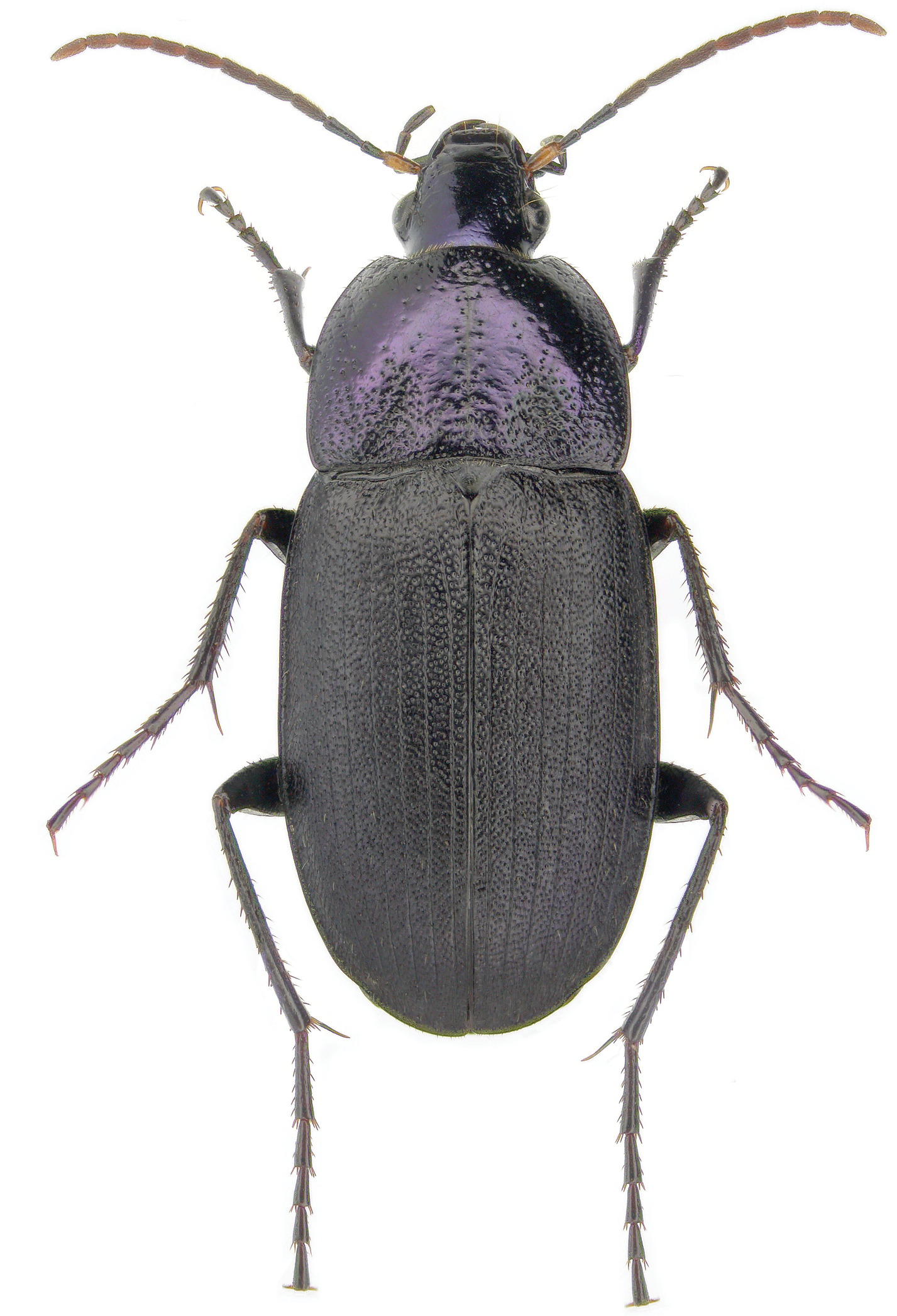
Chlaenius purpuricollis, a member of Harpalinae in the tribe Chlaeniini.

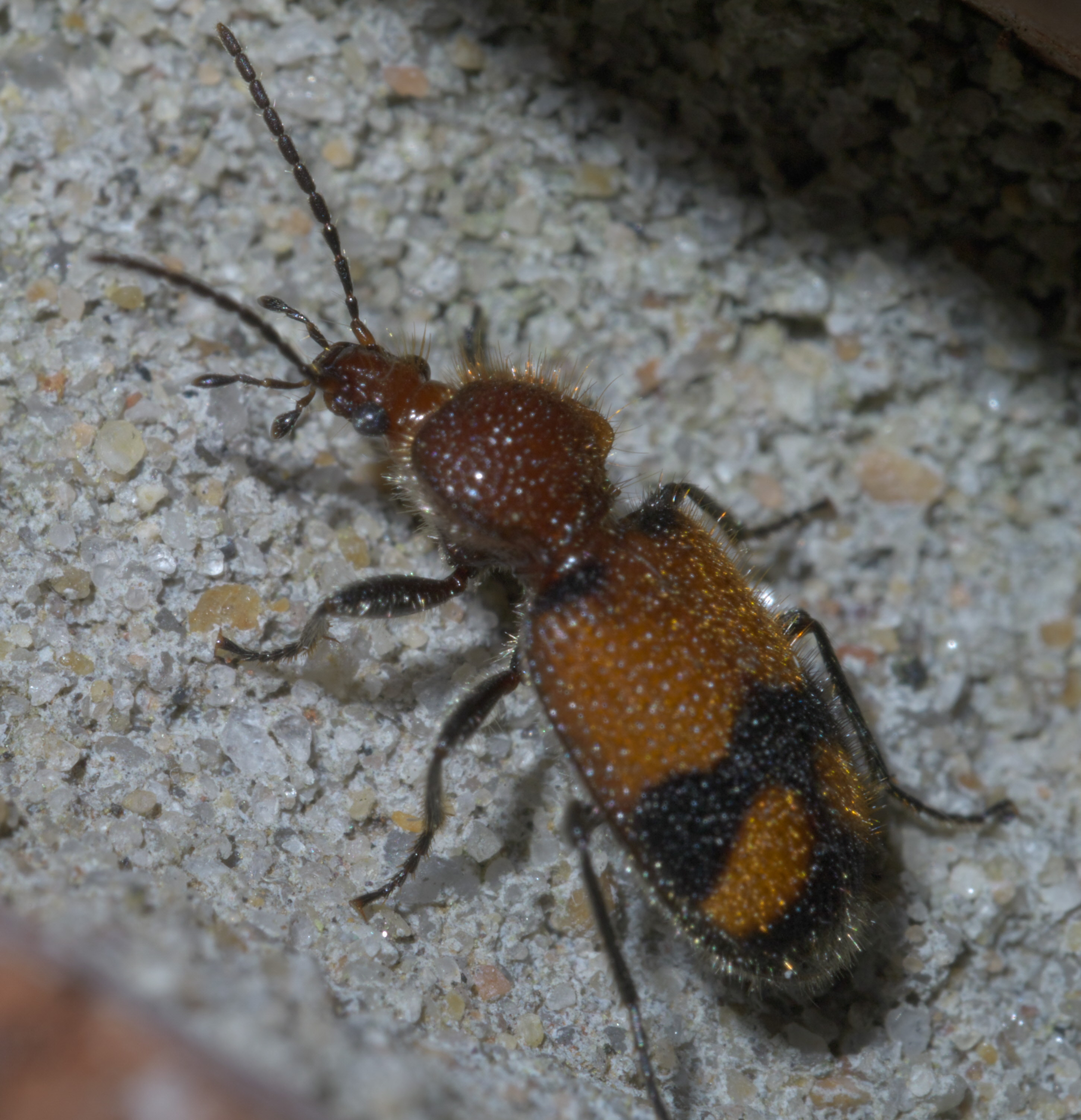
Panagaeus fasciatus, a Harpalinae species within the tribe Pangaeini.

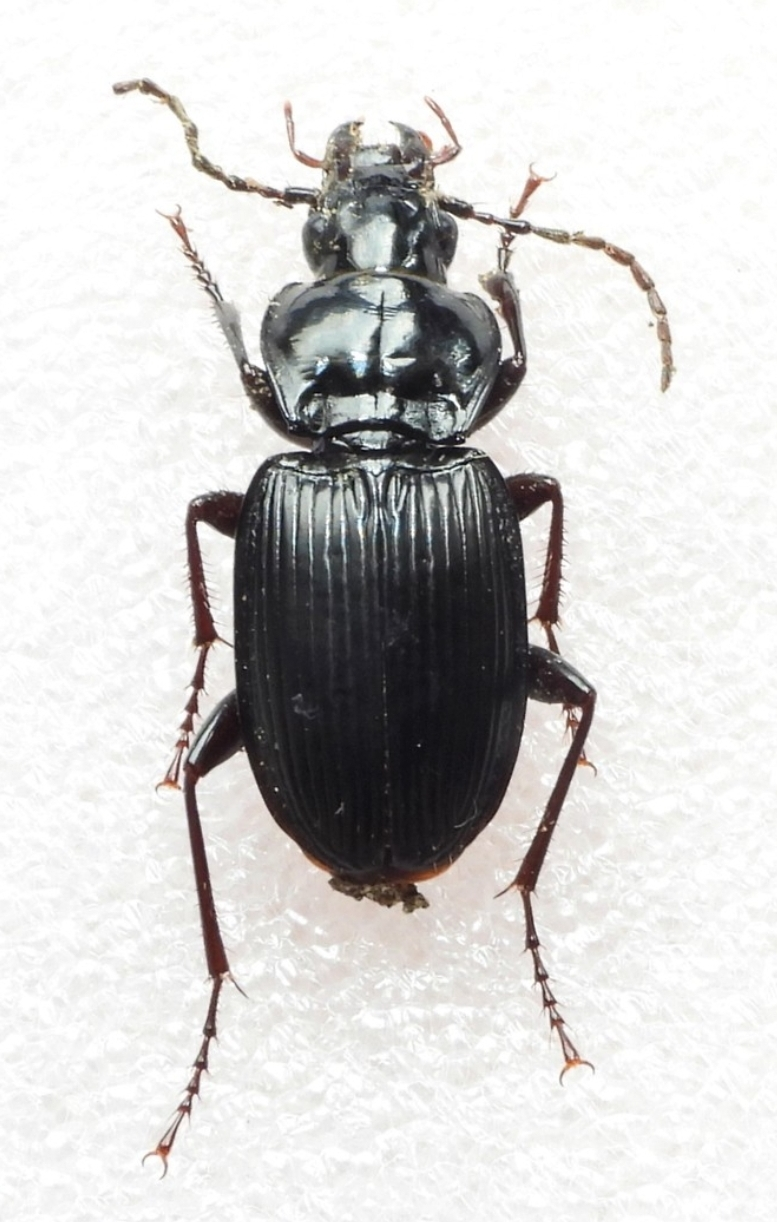
Pterostichus pedemontanus, another member within Harpalinae, in the tribe Pterostichini.

== Biology ==
This subfamily contains the most apomorphic ground beetles, displaying a wide range of forms and behaviors. The morphology of species within Harpalinae range from ant-mimics to charismatic members within the genus Pterostichus. Some exhibit rare feeding habits among ground beetles, including both omnivorous and even herbivorous species. Some members of Harpalinae, especially those restricted to the tropics, are considered to be arboreal. This variety of habitats has been considered to lead to the wide diversification of morphological traits.

== Systematics ==
Recent phylogenetic analysis of Harpalinae has placed approximately 19,000 species within around 40 tribes in this subfamily with nearby sister subfamily clades having species numbers in the hundreds or lower. Few subfamilies within Carabidae have been recovered as supported. The monophyly of Harpalinae has been established with respect to ribosomal DNA and the wingless gene. Further evidence to support this monophyly includes the similarities across the subfamily of their defensive secretions. Further phylogenetic analyses have recovered Brachininae and Trechinae as a clade with Harpalinae. As mentioned above, members in Harpalinae evolved to be arboreal. The evolution of these members involved multiple gains and losses of characters, with the evolution of arboreality originating and reversing several times. With a variety of behaviors and habitats, Harpalinae species are predicted to have had a diversification rate greater than that of the angiosperms.

== Fossil record ==
Fossil records and evolutionary history show that tribes within Harpalinae likely arose and diversified during the mid-Cretaceous period. A first fossil of a member of Harpalinae was dated to be from the late-Cretaceous period, and extant species of Harpalinae were found in Baltic amber.

== Ecology ==
Members of Harpalinae fulfill a variety of ecological niches. These include various symbioses with other insects, ovoviviparity, and even ectoparasitism. Harpaline beetles, like other ground beetles, have pygidial glands that are used for defensive secretions, some secretions containing formic acid. Members of Harpalinae are even considered agents of biological pest control, especially in agricultural settings. While likely not having co-evolved with the angiosperms, angiosperm radiation likely lead to the diversification of ecological niches in Harpalinae.

== Tribes ==
The subfamily Harpalinae contains around 40 tribes, consisting of 19,000 species worldwide. The variety of morphologies within Harpalinae make phylogenetic placements of tribes harder to establish without the support of genetic evidence. Molecular phylogenies may even point to such a rapid speciation of Harpalinae, showing some of these tribes arising at the same time. Supertribes have been constructed based on traits such as chemical defense structures, male and female reproductive structures, elytra morphology, and habitats. While these relationships are not entirely resolved, listed below are tribes currently pertaining to Harpalinae.

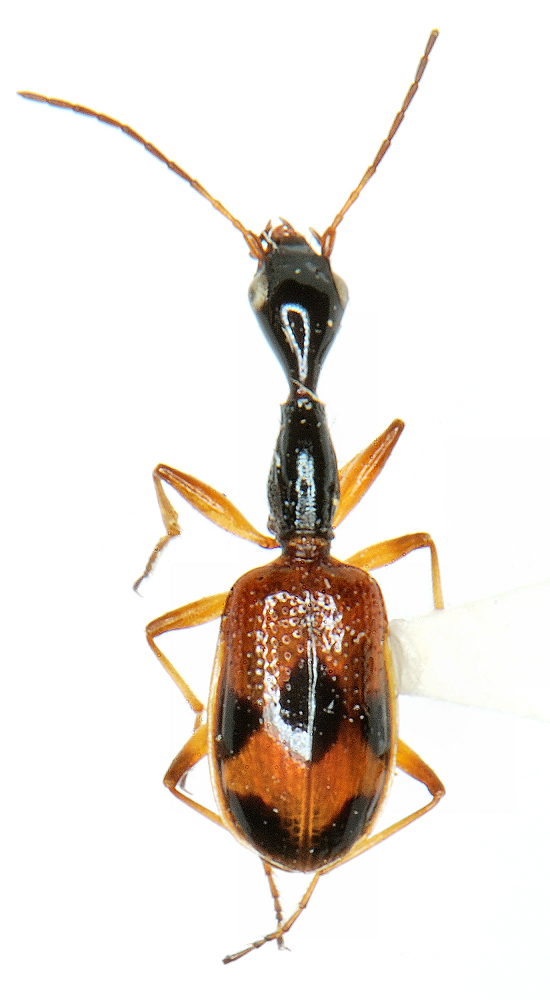
Colliuris pensylvanica, an odd-looking member of Harpalinae within the tribe Odacanthini.

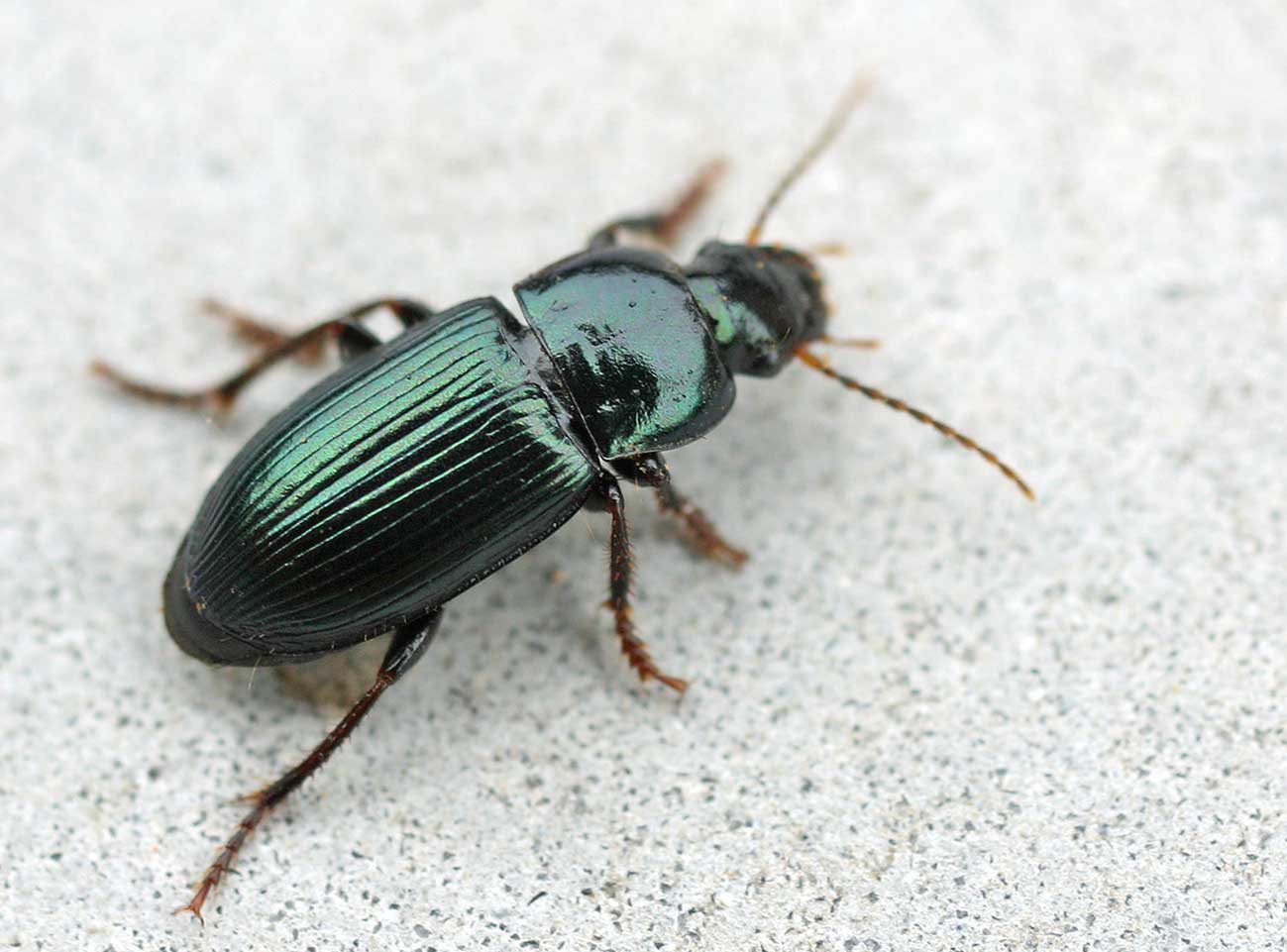
Harpalus affinis

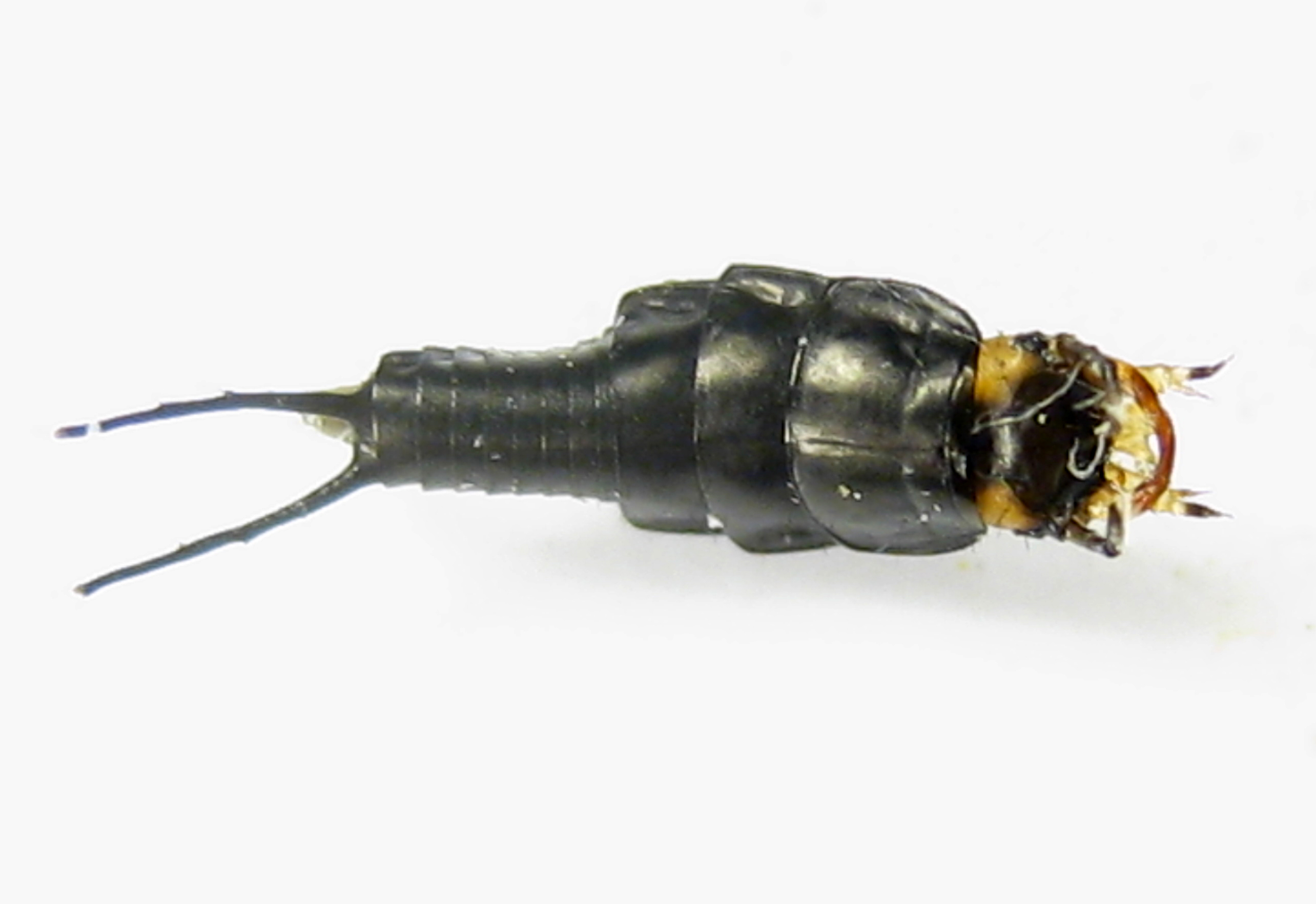
Chlaenius sp., larva

- Abacetini Chaudoir, 1872
- Anisodactylini Lacordaire, 1854
- Anthiini Bonelli, 1813
- Caelostomini Lorenz, 1998, Liebherr 1986
- Calophaenini Laporte, 1834
- Catapieseini
- Chlaeniini Brullé, 1834
- Cnemalobini Germain, 1911
- Ctenodactylini
- Cyclosomini Laporte, 1834
- Dercylini
- Dryptini Bonelli, 1810
- Galeritini
- Graphipterini Latreille, 1802
- Harpalini Bonelli, 1810
- Helluonini
- Hexagoniini
- Lachnophorini Leconte, 1853
- Lebiini Bonelli, 1810
- Licinini Bonelli, 1810
- Loxandrini Erwin & Sims, 1984
- Morionini
- Odacanthini Laporte, 1834
- Oodini Laferté-Sénectère, 1851
- Orthogoniini
- Panagaeini Bonelli, 1810
- Peleciini Chaudoir, 1880
- Pelmatellini Bates, 1882
- Pentagonicini Bates, 1873
- Perigonini Horn, 1881
- Physocrotaphini
- Platynini Bonelli, 1810
- Pseudomorphini Newman, 1842
- Pterostichini Bonelli, 1810
- Stenolophini Kirby, 1837
- Zabrini Bonelli, 1810
- Zuphiini Bonelli, 1810
