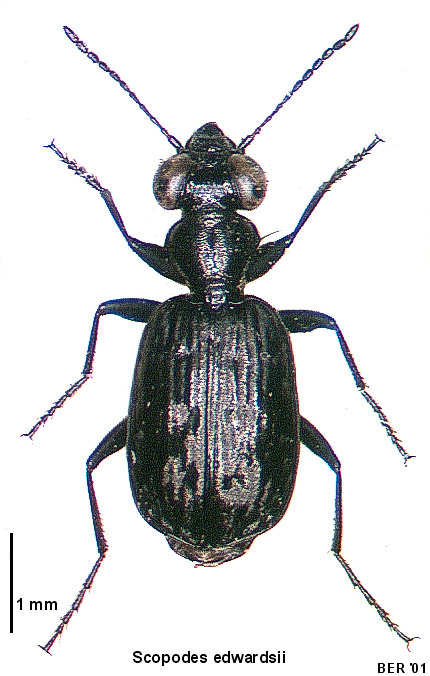
- Scopodes edwardsii

Scientific classification
- Kingdom: Animalia
- Phylum: Arthropoda
- Class: Insecta
- Order: Coleoptera
- Suborder: Adephaga
- Family: Carabidae
- Subfamily: Lebiinae
- Tribe: Odacanthini
- Subtribe: Pentagonicina
- Genus: Scopodes; Erichson, 1842

= Scopodes =

Genus of beetles

Scopodes is a genus of beetles in the family Carabidae and is found in Australia, New Zealand, Indonesia, New Caledonia, and Papua New Guinea.

== Species ==
These 107 species belong to the genus Scopodes:

- Scopodes adonis Darlington, 1968 (New Guinea)
- Scopodes aeneus W.J.MacLeay, 1871 (Australia)
- Scopodes aequus Baehr, 2010 (Australia)
- Scopodes altus Darlington, 1968 (Indonesia and New Guinea)
- Scopodes amplipennis Baehr, 1995 (Indonesia and New Guinea)
- Scopodes angulicollis W.J.MacLeay, 1871 (Australia)
- Scopodes arfakensis Baehr, 2010 (Indonesia and New Guinea)
- Scopodes aspericollis Baehr, 1994 (New Guinea)
- Scopodes assimilis Baehr, 2010 (Australia)
- Scopodes aterrimus Chaudoir, 1872 (Australia)
- Scopodes atricornis Baehr, 1994 (Indonesia and New Guinea)
- Scopodes balkei Baehr, 1995 (Indonesia and New Guinea)
- Scopodes basalis Broun, 1893 (New Zealand)
- Scopodes basipunctatus Baehr, 2010 (Australia)
- Scopodes bicolor Baehr, 1994 (Indonesia and New Guinea)
- Scopodes bifoveatus Baehr, 2010 (Australia)
- Scopodes boops Erichson, 1842 (Australia)
- Scopodes bryophilus Broun, 1886 (New Zealand)
- Scopodes caeruleus Baehr, 1994 (Indonesia and New Guinea)
- Scopodes caledonicus Fauvel, 1903 (New Caledonia)
- Scopodes chalceus Baehr, 1994 (Indonesia and New Guinea)
- Scopodes chalcopterus Baehr, 2010 (Australia)
- Scopodes cheesmanae Darlington, 1968 (Indonesia and New Guinea)
- Scopodes chimbu Darlington, 1968 (New Guinea)
- Scopodes cognatus Broun, 1886 (New Zealand)
- Scopodes convexior Baehr, 2010 (Australia)
- Scopodes corpulentus Baehr, 2010 (Australia)
- Scopodes crenulatus Baehr, 2010 (Australia)
- Scopodes cuprascens Baehr, 1994 (Indonesia and New Guinea)
- Scopodes cyanofoveatus Baehr, 2010 (Australia)
- Scopodes darlingtoni Baehr, 1994 (New Guinea)
- Scopodes denticollis W.J.MacLeay, 1864 (Australia)
- Scopodes depressifrons Baehr, 2010 (Australia)
- Scopodes donabaueri Baehr, 2010 (Australia)
- Scopodes edwardsii Bates, 1878 (New Zealand)
- Scopodes flavipes Blackburn, 1894 (Australia)
- Scopodes fossulatus (Blanchard, 1843) (New Zealand)
- Scopodes foveipennis Baehr, 1994 (Indonesia and New Guinea)
- Scopodes frater Baehr, 2010 (Australia)
- Scopodes frontalis Baehr, 2010 (Australia)
- Scopodes griffithi Sloane, 1903 (Australia)
- Scopodes hornabrooki Baehr, 1998 (New Guinea)
- Scopodes impressus Baehr, 2010 (Australia)
- Scopodes intermedius Blackburn, 1894 (Australia)
- Scopodes interruptus Baehr, 1998 (Indonesia and New Guinea)
- Scopodes intricatus Blackburn, 1895 (Australia)
- Scopodes irregularis Andrewes, 1933 (Indonesia)
- Scopodes laevicollis Baehr, 2010 (Australia)
- Scopodes laevifrons Baehr, 1994 (Indonesia and New Guinea)
- Scopodes laevigatus Bates, 1878 (New Zealand)
- Scopodes laevis W.J.MacLeay, 1871 (Australia)
- Scopodes laticollis Baehr, 2010 (Australia)
- Scopodes levistriatus Broun, 1886 (New Zealand)
- Scopodes longior Baehr, 2010 (Australia)
- Scopodes louwerensi Baehr, 1994
- Scopodes major Baehr, 2010 (Australia)
- Scopodes mediosulcatus Baehr, 2010 (Australia)
- Scopodes minor Baehr, 1994 (Indonesia and New Guinea)
- Scopodes minutissimus Baehr, 2010 (Australia)
- Scopodes moffatti Baehr, 2010 (Australia)
- Scopodes monteithi Baehr, 2010 (Australia)
- Scopodes muliae Baehr, 1995 (Indonesia and New Guinea)
- Scopodes multipunctatus Bates, 1878 (New Zealand)
- Scopodes napieri Baehr, 2010 (Australia)
- Scopodes nigricornis Baehr, 2010 (Australia)
- Scopodes nigripes Baehr, 2010 (Australia)
- Scopodes nigritus Baehr, 2010 (Australia)
- Scopodes nigrocoeruleus Baehr, 2010 (Australia)
- Scopodes ocellatus B.Moore, 1963 (Australia)
- Scopodes opacipennis Baehr, 2010 (Australia)
- Scopodes ovalis B.Moore, 1992 (Australia)
- Scopodes ovipennis Baehr, 2010 (Australia)
- Scopodes perfoveatus Baehr, 1995
- Scopodes perignitus Baehr, 1998 (Indonesia and New Guinea)
- Scopodes peterseni Louwerens, 1969
- Scopodes platypennis Baehr, 2010 (Australia)
- Scopodes prasinus Bates, 1878 (New Zealand)
- Scopodes punctipennis Baehr, 2010 (Australia)
- Scopodes pustulatus Broun, 1882 (New Zealand)
- Scopodes regularis Baehr, 1994 (New Guinea)
- Scopodes reidi Baehr, 2010 (Australia)
- Scopodes reticulatus Baehr, 1994 (Indonesia and New Guinea)
- Scopodes riedeli Baehr, 1994 (Indonesia and New Guinea)
- Scopodes robustus Baehr, 1994 (Indonesia and New Guinea)
- Scopodes rufipes Baehr, 1994 (Indonesia and New Guinea)
- Scopodes rugatus Blackburn, 1894 (Australia)
- Scopodes rugicollis Baehr, 2010 (Australia)
- Scopodes schoenhuberi Baehr, 1999 (New Guinea)
- Scopodes sexfoveatus W.J.MacLeay, 1888 (Australia)
- Scopodes sexpunctus (Newman, 1842) (Australia)
- Scopodes sigillatus Germar, 1848 (Australia)
- Scopodes simplex Blackburn, 1894 (Australia)
- Scopodes splendens B.Moore, 1963 (Australia)
- Scopodes stradbrokensis Baehr, 2010 (Australia)
- Scopodes striaticollis Baehr, 1994 (Indonesia and New Guinea)
- Scopodes sulcipennis Baehr, 2010 (Australia)
- Scopodes tafa Darlington, 1968 (New Guinea)
- Scopodes tasmanicus Bates, 1878 (Australia)
- Scopodes tricostatus Baehr, 2010 (Australia)
- Scopodes tristis Baehr, 1994 (Indonesia and New Guinea)
- Scopodes versicolor Bates, 1878 (New Zealand)
- Scopodes violaceus Baehr, 1994 (Indonesia and New Guinea)
- Scopodes virescens Baehr, 1994 (New Guinea)
- Scopodes viridiaeneus Baehr, 1994 (New Guinea)
- Scopodes wei R.T. & J.R.Bell, 1989 (New Guinea)
- Scopodes wilsoni Darlington, 1968 (New Guinea)
- Scopodes yorkensis Baehr, 2010 (Australia)
