= Parascopodes =

Scientific classification
- Domain: Eukaryota
- Kingdom: Animalia
- Phylum: Arthropoda
- Class: Insecta
- Order: Coleoptera
- Suborder: Adephaga
- Family: Carabidae
- Subfamily: Lebiinae
- Tribe: Odacanthini
- Subtribe: Pentagonicina
- Genus: Parascopodes; Darlington, 1968

Genus of beetles

Parascopodes is a genus in the beetle family Carabidae. There are at least two described species in Parascopodes.

== Species ==
These two species belong to the genus Parascopodes:

- Parascopodes cyaneus (Sloane, 1907) (New Guinea, Papua, and Australia)
- Parascopodes latus Baehr, 2010 (Australia)
