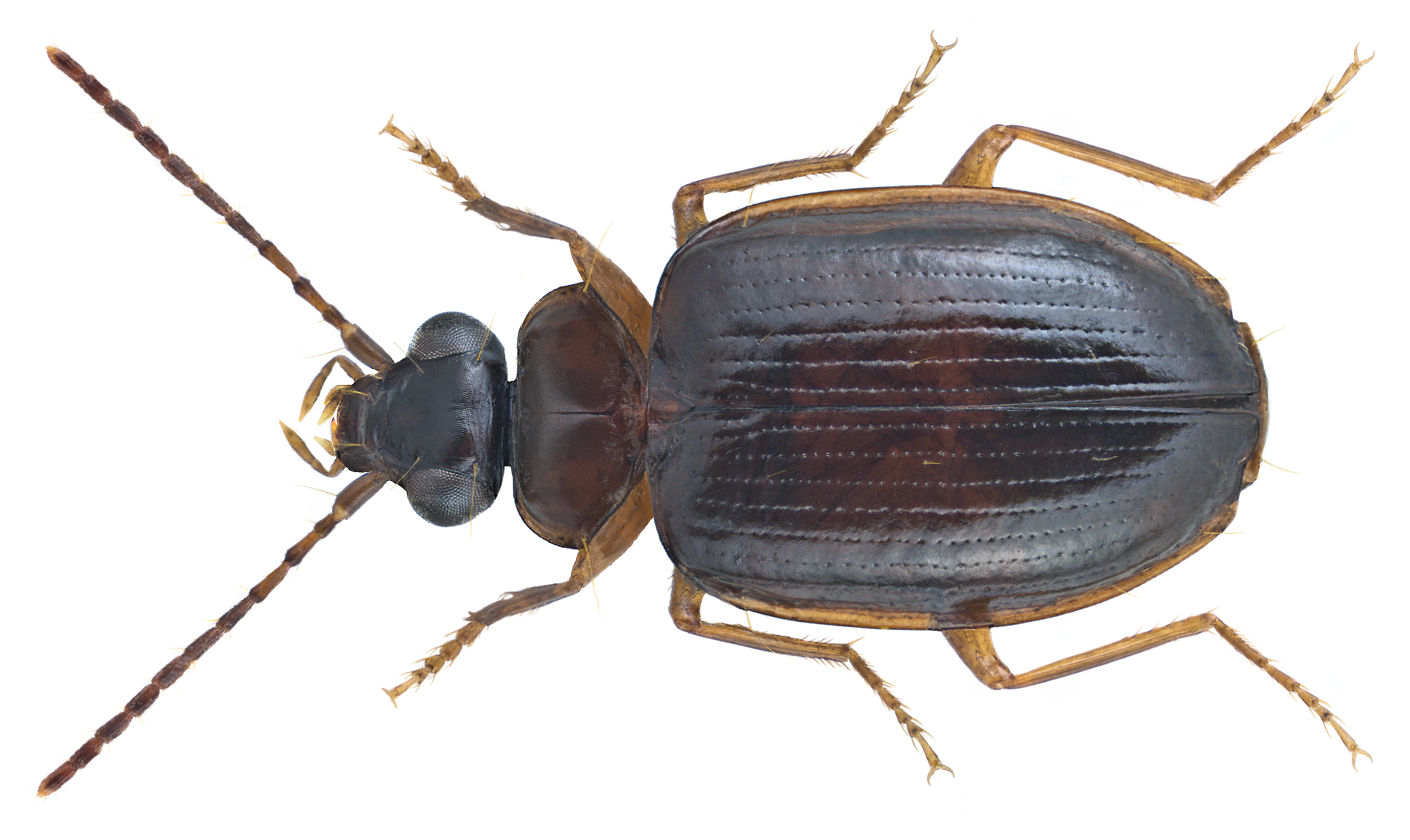
- Pentagonica malickyi

Scientific classification
- Kingdom: Animalia
- Phylum: Arthropoda
- Class: Insecta
- Order: Coleoptera
- Suborder: Adephaga
- Family: Carabidae
- Subfamily: Lebiinae
- Tribe: Odacanthini
- Subtribe: Pentagonicina
- Genus: Pentagonica; Schmidt-Goebel, 1846

= Pentagonica =

Genus of beetles

Pentagonica is a genus of ground beetles in the family Carabidae. There are more than 170 described species in Pentagonica.

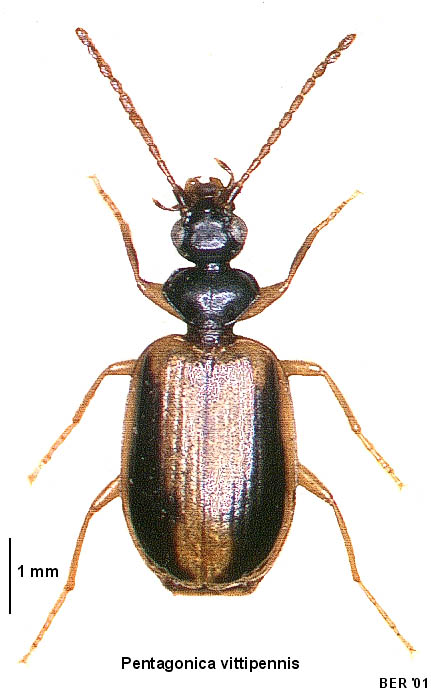
Pentagonica vittipennis

== Species ==
These 176 species belong to the genus Pentagonica:

- Pentagonica abyssinica Basilewsky, 1953
- Pentagonica africana Gestro, 1895
- Pentagonica andrewesi Baehr, 2011
- Pentagonica angulipennis Baehr, 2011
- Pentagonica angulosa Bates, 1883
- Pentagonica angustior Baehr, 2011
- Pentagonica antennata Barker, 1919
- Pentagonica apicalis Baehr, 2011
- Pentagonica apiceincisa Baehr, 2011
- Pentagonica atkinsoni Fauvel, 1882
- Pentagonica atrata Baehr, 2011
- Pentagonica atricornis Baehr, 2011
- Pentagonica atripes Baehr, 2011
- Pentagonica atrorufa (Reiche, 1842)
- Pentagonica avicapitis Baehr, 2011
- Pentagonica baliensis Baehr, 2014
- Pentagonica batantae Baehr, 2011
- Pentagonica batesi Andrewes, 1923
- Pentagonica biak Baehr, 2011
- Pentagonica biangulata Dupuis, 1912
- Pentagonica bicolor (LeConte, 1863)
- Pentagonica bifasciata Chaudoir, 1877
- Pentagonica bilyi Baehr, 2011
- Pentagonica bipartita Burgeon, 1937
- Pentagonica blanda Andrewes, 1929
- Pentagonica boavistensis A.Serrano, 1995
- Pentagonica boettcheri Jedlicka, 1935
- Pentagonica brandti Baehr, 2011
- Pentagonica canaliculata Baehr, 2011
- Pentagonica capicola Basilewsky, 1958
- Pentagonica castanea Baehr, 2011
- Pentagonica cechovskyi Baehr, 2019
- Pentagonica celebensis Baehr, 2011
- Pentagonica ceylonica Baehr, 2011
- Pentagonica cognata Baehr, 2011
- Pentagonica communis Baehr, 2011
- Pentagonica comorica Jeannel, 1949
- Pentagonica conradti Kolbe, 1897
- Pentagonica convexipennis Baehr, 2011
- Pentagonica cuspidata Baehr, 2011
- Pentagonica cyanea (Montrouzier, 1860)
- Pentagonica cyanipennis Liebke, 1939
- Pentagonica daimiella Bates, 1892
- Pentagonica darlingtoni Baehr, 2011
- Pentagonica debeauxi Straneo, 1943
- Pentagonica decellei Basilewsky, 1968
- Pentagonica dichroa Sloane, 1903
- Pentagonica discoidea Baehr, 2011
- Pentagonica dispar Péringuey, 1904
- Pentagonica distinguenda Baehr, 2011
- Pentagonica drescheri Louwerens, 1952
- Pentagonica elegans Péringuey, 1896
- Pentagonica erichsoni Schmidt-Goebel, 1846
- Pentagonica estriata Darlington, 1968
- Pentagonica eurodes Andrewes, 1938
- Pentagonica excisis Baehr, 2011
- Pentagonica fakfak Baehr, 2011
- Pentagonica felix R.T.Bell, 1987
- Pentagonica fijiana Baehr, 2011
- Pentagonica flavicornis Baehr, 2011
- Pentagonica flavipes (LeConte, 1853)
- Pentagonica fukiensis Baehr, 2011
- Pentagonica garainae Baehr, 2011
- Pentagonica giluwe Baehr, 2011
- Pentagonica glabripennis Baehr, 2011
- Pentagonica goniodera (Gemminger & Harold, 1868)
- Pentagonica gonostigma Bates, 1883
- Pentagonica gressitti Baehr, 2011
- Pentagonica grimmi Baehr, 2011
- Pentagonica halmaherae Baehr, 2011
- Pentagonica hebridarum Baehr, 2011
- Pentagonica hexagona (Wollaston, 1867)
- Pentagonica horni Dupuis, 1913
- Pentagonica infans Baehr, 2011
- Pentagonica insularum Baehr, 2011
- Pentagonica irsac Basilewsky, 1954
- Pentagonica jakli Baehr, 2011
- Pentagonica javana Baehr, 2011
- Pentagonica kietae Baehr, 2011
- Pentagonica kitchingi Baehr, 2011
- Pentagonica kivuana Basilewsky, 1953
- Pentagonica kundelunguensis Basilewsky, 1953
- Pentagonica kyushuensis Habu, 1967
- Pentagonica laevissima Baehr, 2011
- Pentagonica laticollis Baehr, 2011
- Pentagonica longicornis Baehr, 2011
- Pentagonica lucens Baehr, 2011
- Pentagonica luzoensis Jedlicka, 1934
- Pentagonica macrops Baehr, 2011
- Pentagonica maculicornis Bates, 1883
- Pentagonica malickyi Baehr, 2011
- Pentagonica marshalli Mateu, 1995
- Pentagonica mascarenica Vinson, 1955
- Pentagonica media Liebke, 1939
- Pentagonica melancholica Reichardt, 1970
- Pentagonica micans Andrewes, 1947
- Pentagonica minuta Baehr, 2014
- Pentagonica montana Basilewsky, 1962
- Pentagonica nepalensis Baehr, 2011
- Pentagonica nigerrima Basilewsky, 1954
- Pentagonica nigricornis Darlington, 1934
- Pentagonica nigrifemur Baehr, 2011
- Pentagonica nigripennis Bates, 1873
- Pentagonica nigritula Straneo, 1943
- Pentagonica nigroantennata Baehr, 2013
- Pentagonica nitens Andrewes, 1937
- Pentagonica nitidicollis Baehr, 2011
- Pentagonica novaeguineae Baehr, 2011
- Pentagonica novairlandica Baehr, 2014
- Pentagonica obscura Chaudoir, 1877
- Pentagonica obscuripes Baehr, 2011
- Pentagonica ochracea Reichardt, 1968
- Pentagonica olivacea Chaudoir, 1877
- Pentagonica omostigma Bates, 1883
- Pentagonica oneili Barker, 1919
- Pentagonica orbitalis Baehr, 2011
- Pentagonica palawanica Baehr, 2013
- Pentagonica pallipes (Nietner, 1856)
- Pentagonica papua Darlington, 1968
- Pentagonica parapapua Baehr, 2011
- Pentagonica parviceps Baehr, 2011
- Pentagonica perrieri Fairmaire, 1899
- Pentagonica philipi R.T.Bell, 1985
- Pentagonica philippinensis Jedlicka, 1934
- Pentagonica piceomarginata Baehr, 2011
- Pentagonica picticornis Bates, 1883
- Pentagonica plaumanni Liebke, 1939
- Pentagonica polita Baehr, 2014
- Pentagonica profemorata Baehr, 2011
- Pentagonica proxima Baehr, 2011
- Pentagonica pseudonitens Baehr, 2011
- Pentagonica quadratipennis Louwerens, 1956
- Pentagonica queenslandica Baehr, 2011
- Pentagonica reticulata Baehr, 2014
- Pentagonica riedeli Baehr, 2011
- Pentagonica roedingeri Liebke, 1951
- Pentagonica rubra Baehr, 2011
- Pentagonica rufa Basilewsky, 1948
- Pentagonica ruficeps Baehr, 2011
- Pentagonica ruficollis Schmidt-Goebel, 1846
- Pentagonica rufonigra Baehr, 2013
- Pentagonica rufopicea Baehr, 2011
- Pentagonica rufovirgata Baehr, 2011
- Pentagonica sarawakensis Baehr, 2011
- Pentagonica schachti Baehr, 2011
- Pentagonica scutellaris Chaudoir, 1877
- Pentagonica semilaevis Baehr, 2011
- Pentagonica semisuturalis Dupuis, 1912
- Pentagonica seyrigi Alluaud, 1935
- Pentagonica similis Baehr, 2011
- Pentagonica sinuaticollis Baehr, 2011
- Pentagonica skalei Baehr, 2011
- Pentagonica soror Baehr, 2011
- Pentagonica spatulata Baehr, 2011
- Pentagonica strandi Liebke, 1939
- Pentagonica subcordicollis Bates, 1873
- Pentagonica sumatrensis Baehr, 2011
- Pentagonica suturalis (Schaum, 1863)
- Pentagonica szetschuana Jedlicka, 1934
- Pentagonica taiwanensis Baehr, 2011
- Pentagonica tekadu Baehr, 2011
- Pentagonica tolgae Baehr, 2011
- Pentagonica transgrediens Baehr, 2011
- Pentagonica trimaculata Chaudoir, 1877
- Pentagonica trivittata (Dejean, 1831)
- Pentagonica trukensis Darlington, 1970
- Pentagonica vadoni Jeannel, 1949
- Pentagonica varicornis Heller, 1916
- Pentagonica venusta Andrewes, 1933
- Pentagonica vicina Baehr, 2011
- Pentagonica vietnami Kirschenhofer, 1994
- Pentagonica vittipennis Chaudoir, 1877
- Pentagonica vittula Darlington, 1939
- Pentagonica vixreticulata Baehr, 2011
- Pentagonica wallaceensis Baehr, 2011
- Pentagonica weigeli Baehr, 2011
