= Asius =

Asius or Asios may refer to:

- Asius (mythology), one of two people in Greek mythology
- Asius of Samos, ancient Greek genealogical poet
- Asius (wasp), a genus of wasp in the family Cryptinae
- Asios (beetle), a genus of beetle in the family Carabidae
- 11554 Asios, an asteroid
- a member of the ancient Asii tribe
