= Crassacantha =

Scientific classification
- Domain: Eukaryota
- Kingdom: Animalia
- Phylum: Arthropoda
- Class: Insecta
- Order: Coleoptera
- Suborder: Adephaga
- Family: Carabidae
- Subfamily: Lebiinae
- Tribe: Odacanthini
- Subtribe: Odacanthina
- Genus: Crassacantha; Baehr, 1995
- Species: C. bidens

Binomial name
- Crassacantha bidens Baehr, 1995

Genus of beetles

Crassacantha is a genus in the ground beetle family Carabidae. This genus has a single species, Crassacantha bidens. It is found in Indonesia and New Guinea.
