= Protocolliuris =

Scientific classification
- Kingdom: Animalia
- Phylum: Arthropoda
- Class: Insecta
- Order: Coleoptera
- Suborder: Adephaga
- Family: Carabidae
- Tribe: Odacanthini
- Subtribe: Odacanthina
- Genus: Protocolliuris; Liebke, 1931
- Species: P. coerulans

Binomial name
- Protocolliuris coerulans (Künckel d'Herculais, 1891)

Genus of beetles

Protocolliuris is a genus in the ground beetle family Carabidae. This genus has a single species, Protocolliuris coerulans. It is found in Madagascar.
