= Polydamasium =

Scientific classification
- Domain: Eukaryota
- Kingdom: Animalia
- Phylum: Arthropoda
- Class: Insecta
- Order: Coleoptera
- Suborder: Adephaga
- Family: Carabidae
- Subfamily: Lebiinae
- Tribe: Odacanthini
- Subtribe: Odacanthina
- Genus: Polydamasium; Liebke, 1938

Genus of beetles

Polydamasium is a genus in the ground beetle family Carabidae. There are at least two described species in Polydamasium.

== Species ==
These two species belong to the genus Polydamasium:

- Polydamasium anomalum (Darlington, 1968) (Indonesia, New Guinea)
- Polydamasium strandi Liebke, 1938 (Indonesia)
