= Pentagonica bicolor =

Scientific classification
- Domain: Eukaryota
- Kingdom: Animalia
- Phylum: Arthropoda
- Class: Insecta
- Order: Coleoptera
- Suborder: Adephaga
- Family: Carabidae
- Genus: Pentagonica
- Species: P. bicolor

Binomial name
- Pentagonica bicolor (LeConte, 1863)

Species of beetle

Pentagonica bicolor is a species of ground beetle in the family Carabidae. It is found in North America.
