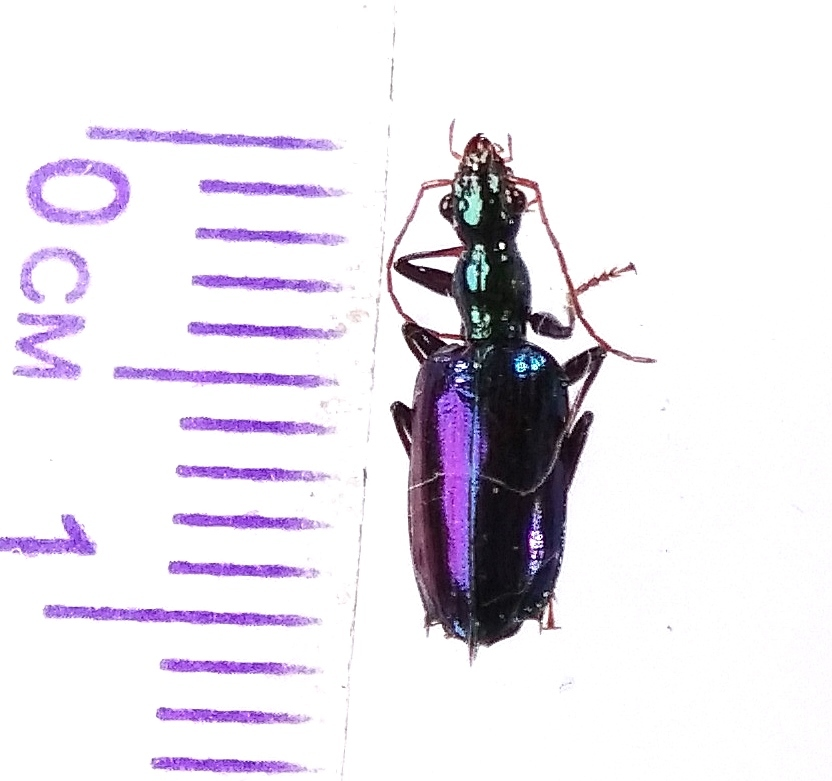
- Dicraspeda violacea

Scientific classification
- Domain: Eukaryota
- Kingdom: Animalia
- Phylum: Arthropoda
- Class: Insecta
- Order: Coleoptera
- Suborder: Adephaga
- Family: Carabidae
- Subfamily: Lebiinae
- Tribe: Odacanthini
- Subtribe: Odacanthina
- Genus: Dicraspeda; Chaudoir, 1863

= Dicraspeda =

Genus of beetles

Dicraspeda is a genus in the beetle family Carabidae. There are more than 30 described species in Dicraspeda.

== Species ==
These 34 species belong to the genus Dicraspeda:

- Dicraspeda angulipennis Baehr, 2003
- Dicraspeda bellorum Baehr, 2009 - New Guinea and Papua
- Dicraspeda bispinosa Darlington, 1968 - Indonesia, New Guinea, Papua
- Dicraspeda brunnea Chaudoir, 1863 - Malaysia, Indonesia, Borneo, Philippines, New Guinea, Australia
- Dicraspeda brunneipennis (Sloane, 1917) - Australia
- Dicraspeda cheesmanae Baehr, 2009 - New Guinea and Papua
- Dicraspeda coeruleipennis Baehr, 2006
- Dicraspeda denticulata Baehr, 1997 - Indonesia and New Guinea
- Dicraspeda dubia (Gestro, 1879) - Indonesia, New Guinea, Australia
- Dicraspeda glabrata Baehr, 2003 - Australia
- Dicraspeda glabripennis Baehr, 2006 - Indonesia and New Guinea
- Dicraspeda hebridarum Baehr, 1998 - Vanuatu
- Dicraspeda inermis Louwerens, 1970 - the Solomon Islands and Australia
- Dicraspeda intermedia Baehr, 1997 - Indonesia and New Guinea
- Dicraspeda keiana Baehr, 2016 - Indonesia and New Guinea
- Dicraspeda kokodae Baehr, 2009 - New Guinea and Papua
- Dicraspeda laticollis Baehr, 1997 - Indonesia and New Guinea
- Dicraspeda loebli Baehr, 1996 - Papua
- Dicraspeda longiloba (Liebke, 1938) - Indonesia, New Guinea, Australia
- Dicraspeda minuta Baehr, 1998 - New Guinea and Papua
- Dicraspeda missai Baehr, 2006 - New Guinea and Papua
- Dicraspeda nigripes Baehr, 2003 - Indonesia and New Guinea
- Dicraspeda nitida (Sloane, 1917) - Australia
- Dicraspeda obscura (Laporte, 1867) - Australia
- Dicraspeda obsoleta Baehr, 1996 - Indonesia and New Guinea
- Dicraspeda ophthalmica Baehr, 2009 - Indonesia
- Dicraspeda papuensis Baehr, 2003 - New Guinea and Papua
- Dicraspeda quadrispinosa (Chaudoir, 1869) - Indonesia, New Guinea, Papua, Solomon Islands
- Dicraspeda skalei Baehr, 2016 - Indonesia and New Guinea
- Dicraspeda sublaevis (W.J.MacLeay, 1888) - Indonesia, Borneo, Australia
- Dicraspeda subrufipennis Baehr, 2006
- Dicraspeda ullrichi Baehr, 1996 - New Guinea and Papua
- Dicraspeda vandeveldeae Baehr, 2009 - New Guinea and Papua
- Dicraspeda violacea (Sloane, 1907) - Indonesia and New Guinea
