= Giachinoana =

Scientific classification
- Domain: Eukaryota
- Kingdom: Animalia
- Phylum: Arthropoda
- Class: Insecta
- Order: Coleoptera
- Suborder: Adephaga
- Family: Carabidae
- Subfamily: Lebiinae
- Tribe: Odacanthini
- Subtribe: Odacanthina
- Genus: Giachinoana; Baehr, 2003

Genus of beetles

Giachinoana is a genus in the beetle family Carabidae. There are at least two described species in Giachinoana, found in Australia.

== Species ==
These two species belong to the genus Giachinoana:

- Giachinoana carinipennis Baehr, 2003
- Giachinoana insulicola Baehr, 2016
