= Lachnothorax =

Scientific classification
- Kingdom: Animalia
- Phylum: Arthropoda
- Class: Insecta
- Order: Coleoptera
- Suborder: Adephaga
- Family: Carabidae
- Subfamily: Lebiinae
- Tribe: Odacanthini
- Subtribe: Odacanthina
- Genus: Lachnothorax; Motschulsky, 1862

Genus of beetles

Lachnothorax is a genus in the beetle family Carabidae. There are about eight described species in Lachnothorax.

== Species ==
These eight species belong to the genus Lachnothorax:

- Lachnothorax biguttatus Motschulsky, 1862 (Sri Lanka, India, Vietnam, Indonesia)
- Lachnothorax grandemaculatus Anichtchenko, 2018 (Philippines)
- Lachnothorax inornatus Baehr, 1996 (Philippines)
- Lachnothorax lunatus (Liebke, 1931) (Somalia and Kenya)
- Lachnothorax nossibianus (Fairmaire, 1880) (Madagascar)
- Lachnothorax philippinus Baehr, 1996 (Philippines)
- Lachnothorax pustulatus (Dejean, 1831) (Africa)
- Lachnothorax tokkia (Gestro, 1875) (Malaysia, Indonesia, New Guinea, Australia)
