= Myrmecodemus =

Scientific classification
- Kingdom: Animalia
- Phylum: Arthropoda
- Class: Insecta
- Order: Coleoptera
- Suborder: Adephaga
- Family: Carabidae
- Subfamily: Lebiinae
- Tribe: Odacanthini
- Subtribe: Odacanthina
- Genus: Myrmecodemus; Sloane, 1923

Subgenera
- Myrmecodemus Sloane, 1923; Trichodemus Baehr, 2005

Synonyms
- Trichodemus Baehr, 2005

Genus of beetles

Myrmecodemus is a genus in the ground beetle family Carabidae. There are about five described species in Myrmecodemus, found in Australia.

== Species ==
These five species belong to the genus Myrmecodemus:

- Myrmecodemus formicoides (Sloane, 1910)
- Myrmecodemus globulicollis (W.J.MacLeay, 1888)
- Myrmecodemus lucai Baehr, 2005
- Myrmecodemus pilosellus Baehr, 2005
- Myrmecodemus riverinae (Sloane, 1890)
