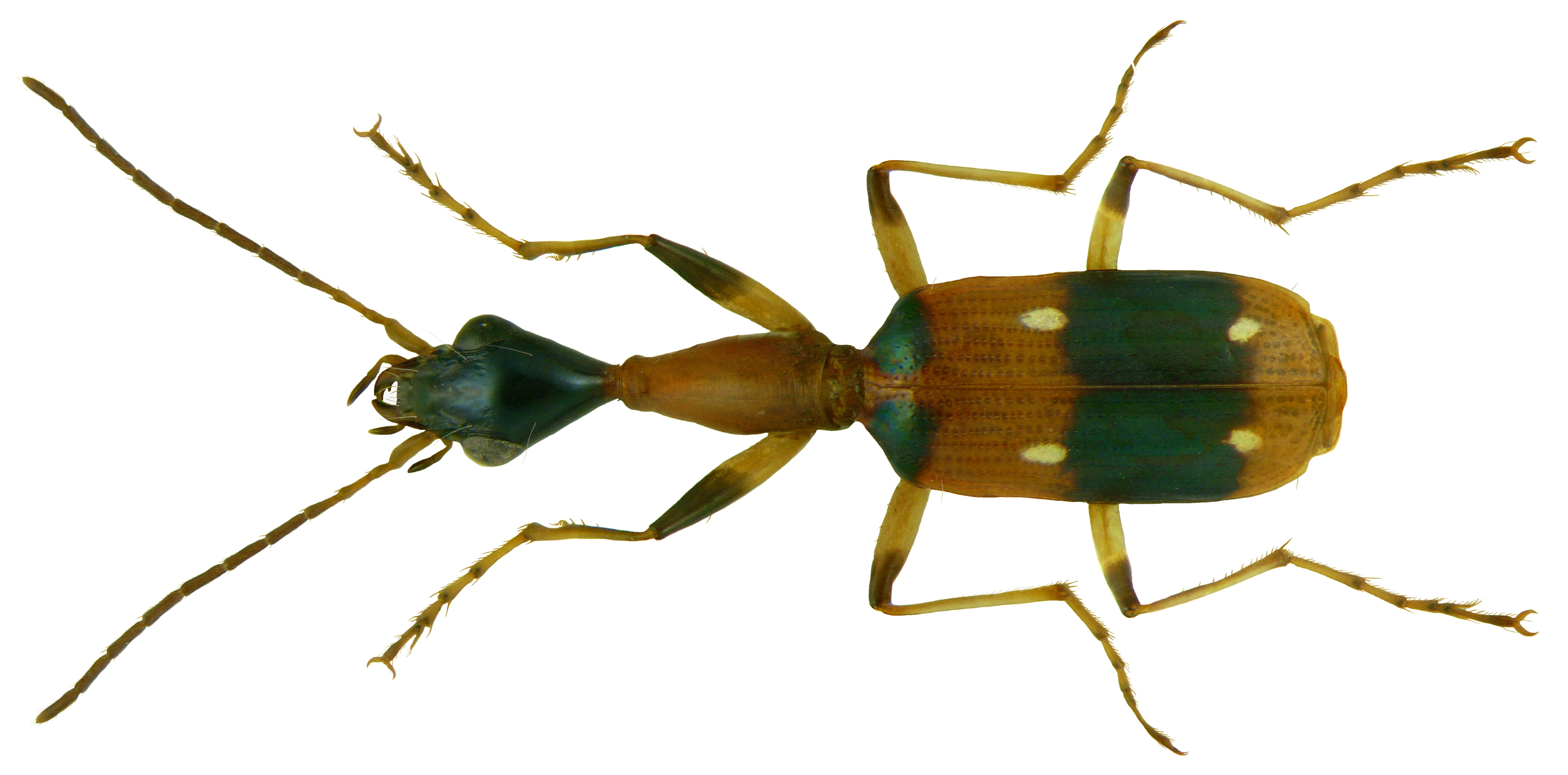
- Ophionea indica (Thunberg, 1784)

Scientific classification
- Domain: Eukaryota
- Kingdom: Animalia
- Phylum: Arthropoda
- Class: Insecta
- Order: Coleoptera
- Suborder: Adephaga
- Family: Carabidae
- Tribe: Odacanthini
- Genus: Ophionea; Klug, 1821

Type species
- Attelabus indicus Thunberg, 1784

= Ophionea =

Genus of beetles

Ophionea is a genus of beetles in the family Carabidae. Like others in the family, they are predatory. The genus is mainly found in tropical Asia.

The genus includes the following species:

- Ophionea australica Baehr, 1996
- Ophionea bakeri Dupuis, 1913
- Ophionea bhamoensis Bates, 1892
- Ophionea brandti Baehr, 1996
- Ophionea celebensis Baehr, 1996
- Ophionea ceylonica Baehr, 1996
- Ophionea foersteri Bouchard, 1903
- Ophionea gestroi Maindron, 1910
- Ophionea hoashii Habu, 1962
- Ophionea indica (Thunberg, 1784)
- Ophionea insignis (Baehr, 1997)
- Ophionea interstitialis Schmidt-Gobel, 1846
- Ophionea ishiii Habu, 1961
- Ophionea leytensis Baehr, 1996
- Ophionea malickyi Baehr, 1996
- Ophionea micronota Andrewes, 1937
- Ophionea nigrofasciata Schmidt-Gobel, 1846
- Ophionea puncticollis Sloane, 1923
- Ophionea storeyi Baehr, 1996
- Ophionea thouzeti Castelnau, 1867
