= Cryptocolliuris =

Scientific classification
- Kingdom: Animalia
- Phylum: Arthropoda
- Clade: Pancrustacea
- Class: Insecta
- Order: Coleoptera
- Suborder: Adephaga
- Family: Carabidae
- Subfamily: Lebiinae
- Tribe: Odacanthini
- Subtribe: Odacanthina
- Genus: Cryptocolliuris; Basilewsky, 1955
- Species: C. pantosi

Binomial name
- Cryptocolliuris pantosi Basilewsky, 1955

Genus of beetles

Cryptocolliuris is a genus in the ground beetle family Carabidae. This genus has a single species, Cryptocolliuris pantosi. It is found in the Democratic Republic of the Congo. The genus is classified in the subtribe Odacanthina within the tribe Odacanthini of the ground beetle subfamily Lebiinae.
