= Pentagonica marshalli =

Scientific classification
- Domain: Eukaryota
- Kingdom: Animalia
- Phylum: Arthropoda
- Class: Insecta
- Order: Coleoptera
- Suborder: Adephaga
- Family: Carabidae
- Genus: Pentagonica
- Species: P. marshalli

Binomial name
- Pentagonica marshalli Mateu, 1995

Species of beetle

Pentagonica marshalli is a species of ground beetle in the family Carabidae. It is found in North America.
