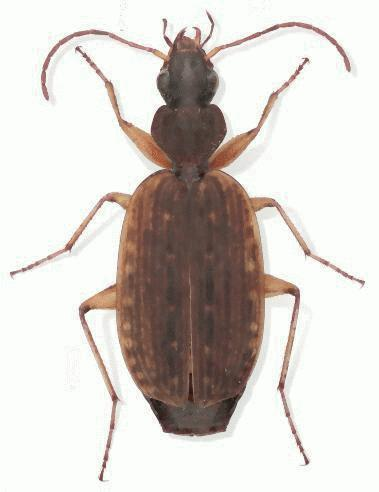

Scientific classification
- Domain: Eukaryota
- Kingdom: Animalia
- Phylum: Arthropoda
- Class: Insecta
- Order: Coleoptera
- Suborder: Adephaga
- Family: Carabidae
- Subfamily: Lebiinae
- Tribe: Odacanthini
- Subtribe: Homethina
- Genus: Homethes; Newman, 1842

Synonyms
- Homothes Gemminger & Harold, 1868

= Homethes =

Genus of beetles

Homethes is a genus in the beetle family Carabidae. There are about 10 described species in Homethes.

== Species ==
These 10 species belong to the genus Homethes:

- Homethes angulatus Blackburn, 1892 (Australia)
- Homethes elegans Newman, 1842 (Australia)
- Homethes gracilis Blackburn, 1892 (Australia)
- Homethes guttifer Germar, 1848 (Australia)
- Homethes marginipennis W.J.MacLeay, 1871 (Australia)
- Homethes microguttatus Louwerens, 1952 (Indonesia and Philippines)
- Homethes niger Sloane, 1920 (Australia)
- Homethes rotundatus Blackburn, 1892 (Australia)
- Homethes sericeus (Erichson, 1842) (Australia)
- Homethes velutinus W.J.MacLeay, 1871 (Australia)
