= Neoeudalia =

Scientific classification
- Kingdom: Animalia
- Phylum: Arthropoda
- Class: Insecta
- Order: Coleoptera
- Suborder: Adephaga
- Family: Carabidae
- Tribe: Odacanthini
- Subtribe: Odacanthina
- Genus: Neoeudalia; Baehr, 2005
- Species: N. nigra

Binomial name
- Neoeudalia nigra (Sloane, 1900)

Genus of beetles

Neoeudalia is a genus in the ground beetle family Carabidae. This genus has a single species, Neoeudalia nigra. It is found in Australia.
