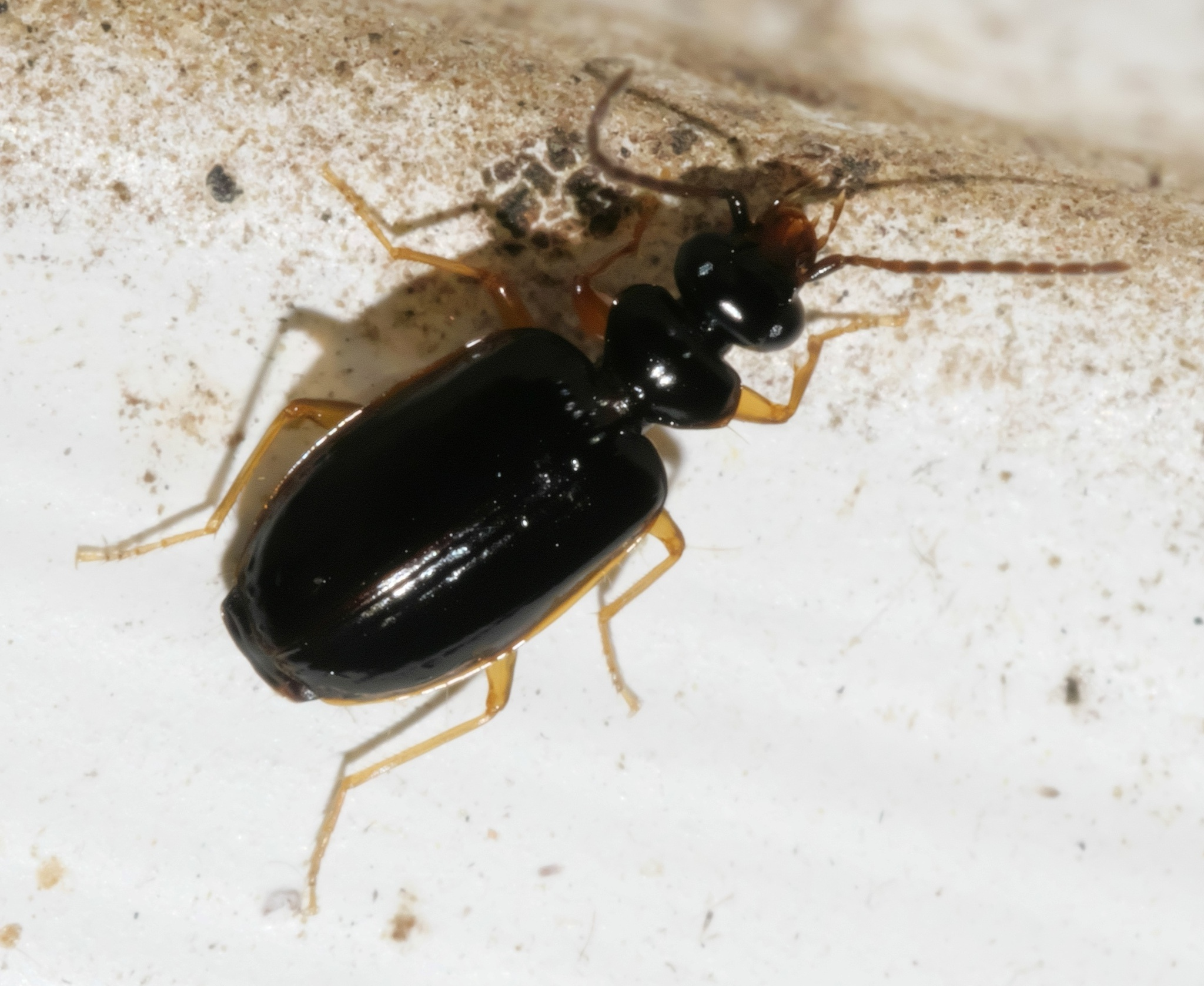
- Pentagonica flavipes, Oklahoma

Scientific classification
- Domain: Eukaryota
- Kingdom: Animalia
- Phylum: Arthropoda
- Class: Insecta
- Order: Coleoptera
- Suborder: Adephaga
- Family: Carabidae
- Genus: Pentagonica
- Species: P. flavipes

Binomial name
- Pentagonica flavipes (LeConte, 1853)

= Pentagonica flavipes =

Species of beetle

Pentagonica flavipes is a species of ground beetle in the family Carabidae. It is found in the Caribbean Sea, Central America, North America, and the Caribbean.

== Subspecies ==
These two subspecies belong to the species Pentagonica flavipes:

- Pentagonica flavipes flavipes (LeConte, 1853)
- Pentagonica flavipes picipes Darlington, 1936
