= Deipyrodes =

Scientific classification
- Domain: Eukaryota
- Kingdom: Animalia
- Phylum: Arthropoda
- Class: Insecta
- Order: Coleoptera
- Suborder: Adephaga
- Family: Carabidae
- Subfamily: Lebiinae
- Tribe: Odacanthini
- Subtribe: Odacanthina
- Genus: Deipyrodes; Bousquet, 2002

Synonyms
- Deipyrus Liebke, 1938

Genus of beetles

Deipyrodes is a genus in the ground beetle family Carabidae. There are at least two described species in Deipyrodes, found in Australia.

== Species ==
These two species belong to the genus Deipyrodes:

- Deipyrodes inops (Baehr, 2005)
- Deipyrodes palustris (Sloane, 1910)
