= Arame macra =

Scientific classification
- Domain: Eukaryota
- Kingdom: Animalia
- Phylum: Arthropoda
- Class: Insecta
- Order: Coleoptera
- Suborder: Adephaga
- Family: Carabidae
- Subfamily: Lebiinae
- Tribe: Odacanthini
- Subtribe: Odacanthina
- Genus: Arame
- Species: A. macra

Binomial name
- Arame macra Andrewes, 1919

Species of beetle

Arame macra is a species of ground beetle in the family Carabidae, found in Sri Lanka.
