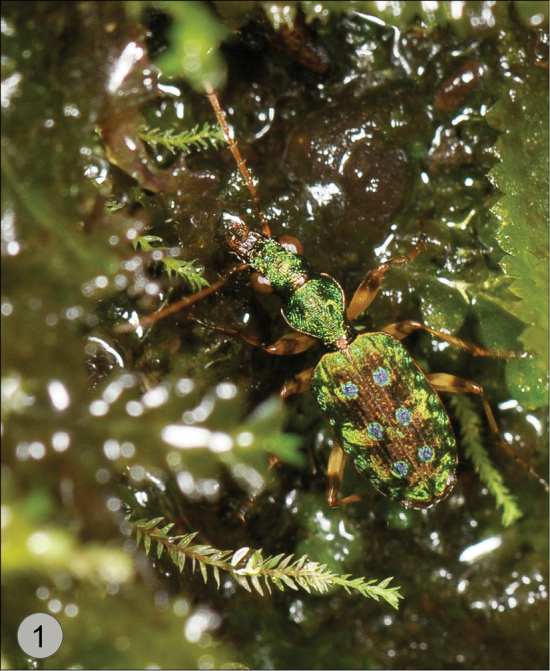

Scientific classification
- Kingdom: Animalia
- Phylum: Arthropoda
- Clade: Pancrustacea
- Class: Insecta
- Order: Coleoptera
- Suborder: Adephaga
- Family: Carabidae
- Tribe: Odacanthini
- Subtribe: Homethina
- Genus: Quammenis; Erwin, 2000
- Species: Q. spectabilis

Binomial name
- Quammenis spectabilis Erwin, 2000

= Quammenis =

Quammenis spectabilis

Genus of beetles

Quammenis is a genus of ground beetles in the family Carabidae. This genus is monotypic, being represented by the single species Quammenis spectabilis, which is found in Costa Rica.
