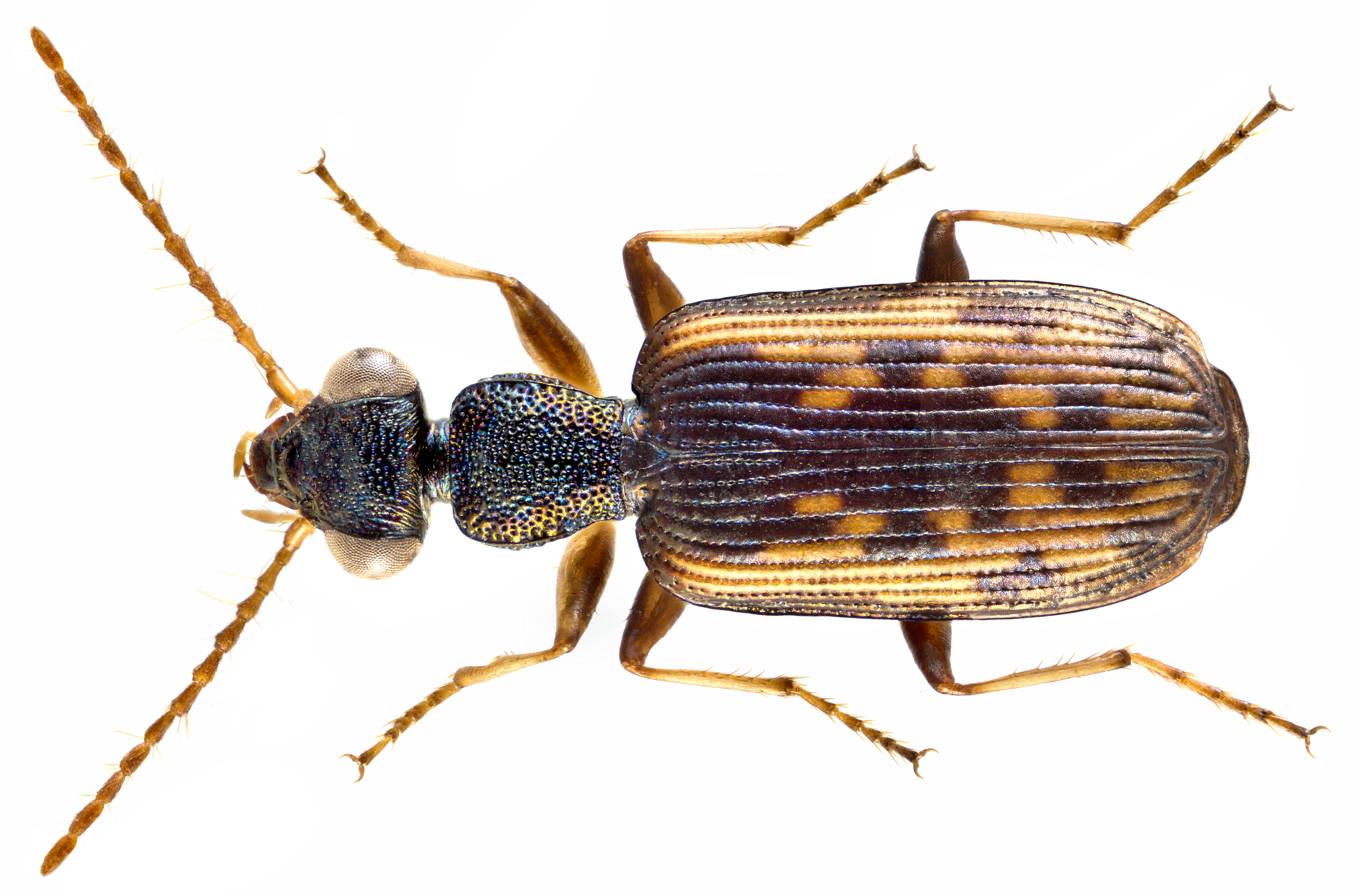
- Lasiocera somalica

Scientific classification
- Kingdom: Animalia
- Phylum: Arthropoda
- Class: Insecta
- Order: Coleoptera
- Suborder: Adephaga
- Family: Carabidae
- Subfamily: Lebiinae
- Tribe: Odacanthini
- Subtribe: Odacanthina
- Genus: Lasiocera; Dejean, 1831

= Lasiocera =

Genus of beetles

Lasiocera is a genus in the beetle family Carabidae. There are about 14 described species in Lasiocera.

== Species ==
These 14 species belong to the genus Lasiocera:

- Lasiocera analava Alluaud, 1917 (Madagascar)
- Lasiocera asmara Basilewsky, 1962 (Eritrea)
- Lasiocera coromandelica Maindron, 1906 (Sri Lanka and India)
- Lasiocera corrugata Basilewsky, 1963 (Africa)
- Lasiocera egregia Péringuey, 1896 (Mozambique and Zimbabwe)
- Lasiocera gracilis Boheman, 1848 (South Africa)
- Lasiocera malabarica Maindron, 1906 (India)
- Lasiocera mirei Basilewsky, 1970 (Cameroon)
- Lasiocera nitidula Dejean, 1831 (Africa)
- Lasiocera orientalis Chaudoir, 1850 (Pakistan and India)
- Lasiocera peringueyi Kuntzen, 1919 (Botswana, Namibia, South Africa)
- Lasiocera schuelei R.M.Serrano, 2017 (Angola)
- Lasiocera somalica Basilewsky, 1948 (Africa)
- Lasiocera tessellata Klug, 1853 (Africa)
