= Renneria =

Scientific classification
- Domain: Eukaryota
- Kingdom: Animalia
- Phylum: Arthropoda
- Class: Insecta
- Order: Coleoptera
- Suborder: Adephaga
- Family: Carabidae
- Tribe: Odacanthini
- Subtribe: Odacanthina
- Genus: Renneria; Baehr, 1999
- Species: R. kamouni

Binomial name
- Renneria kamouni Baehr, 1999

Genus of beetles

Renneria is a genus in the ground beetle family Carabidae. This genus has a single species, Renneria kamouni. It is found in Australia.
