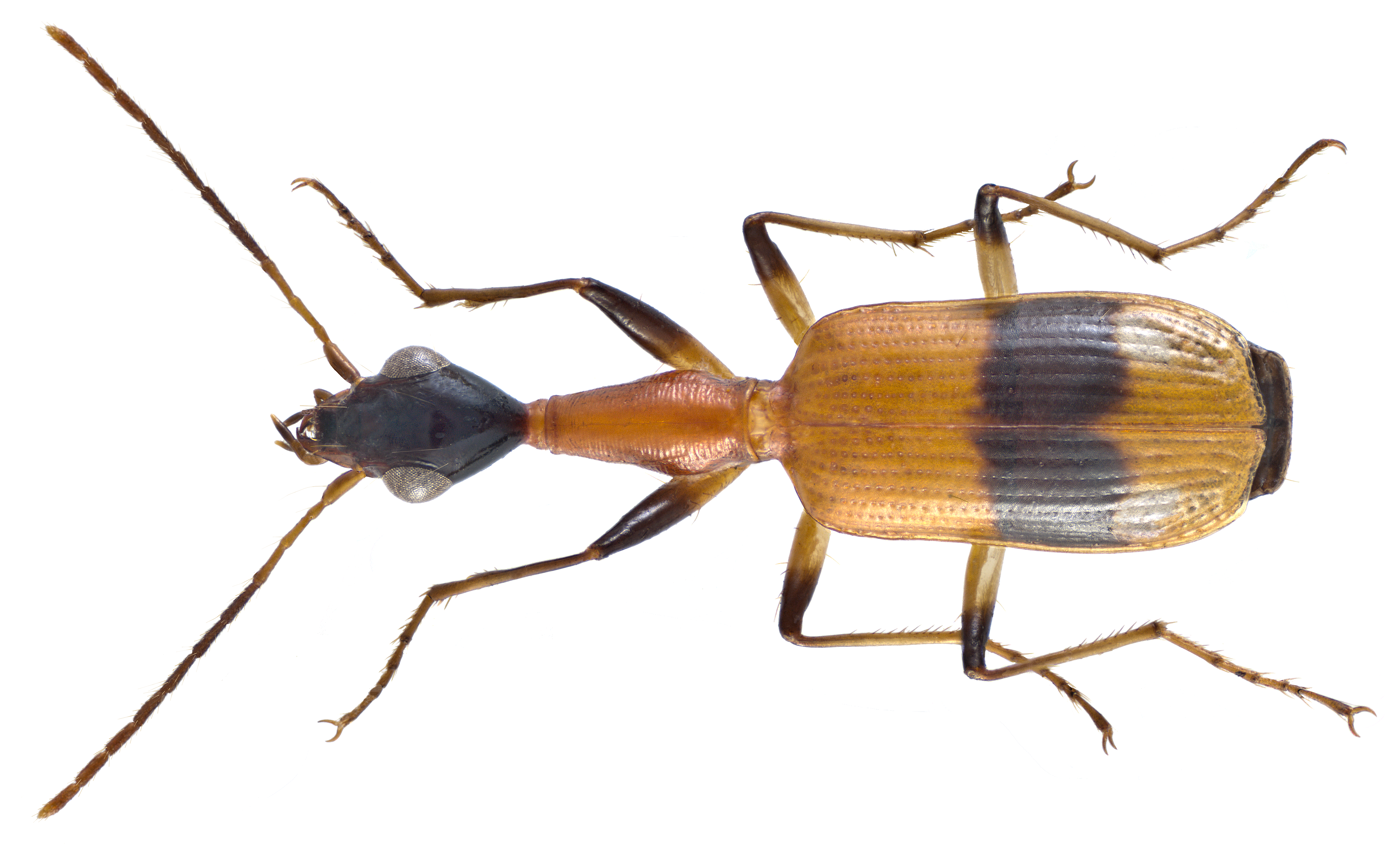
- Archicolliuris dimidiata

Scientific classification
- Domain: Eukaryota
- Kingdom: Animalia
- Phylum: Arthropoda
- Class: Insecta
- Order: Coleoptera
- Suborder: Adephaga
- Family: Carabidae
- Subfamily: Lebiinae
- Tribe: Odacanthini
- Subtribe: Odacanthina
- Genus: Archicolliuris; Liebke, 1931

= Archicolliuris =

Genus of beetles

Archicolliuris is a genus in the beetle family Carabidae. There are more than 20 described species in Archicolliuris.

== Species ==
These 23 species belong to the genus Archicolliuris:

- Archicolliuris albicolon (Bates, 1892) (Myanmar)
- Archicolliuris benoiti Basilewsky, 1974 (Seychelles)
- Archicolliuris bimaculata (Kollar & L.Redtenbacher, 1844) (Japan, Taiwan, Indomalaya)
- Archicolliuris birmanica (Liebke, 1938) (Myanmar)
- Archicolliuris burgeoni (Liebke, 1931) (Africa)
- Archicolliuris butonensis (Kirschenhofer, 1996) (Indonesia)
- Archicolliuris cribricollis (Andrewes, 1929) (Indonesia)
- Archicolliuris dimidiata (Chaudoir, 1848) (Africa)
- Archicolliuris distigma (Chaudoir, 1850) (Southeast Asia)
- Archicolliuris fasciata (LaFerté-Sénectère, 1849) (Africa)
- Archicolliuris gibbosa Basilewsky, 1970 (Cameroon, Democratic Republic of the Congo)
- Archicolliuris immaculata (Liebke, 1938) (Sri Lanka and India)
- Archicolliuris kodadai (Kirschenhofer, 1996) (Indonesia, Borneo)
- Archicolliuris linea (Andrewes, 1926) (Indonesia, Borneo)
- Archicolliuris occipitalis Baehr, 2005
- Archicolliuris olsoufieffi (Alluaud, 1935) (Madagascar)
- Archicolliuris opacipennis (Gestro, 1888) (Indomalaya)
- Archicolliuris papua (Darlington, 1968) (New Guinea)
- Archicolliuris par (Darlington, 1968) (New Guinea and Australia)
- Archicolliuris philippinensis (Donabauer, 1996) (Philippines)
- Archicolliuris ranomafanae Kavanaugh & Rainio, 2016 (Madagascar)
- Archicolliuris rubripes (Andrewes, 1926) (Indonesia)
- Archicolliuris rudicollis (Fairmaire, 1898) (Madagascar)
- Archicolliuris rufopicea (Chaudoir, 1863) (Tanzania and South Africa)
- Archicolliuris senegalensis (Lepeletier & Audinet-Serville, 1825) (Africa)
- Archicolliuris splendissimus Baehr, 2005 (Australia)
- Archicolliuris subnitida (Liebke, 1933) (Mozambique)
- Archicolliuris tenuis (Andrewes, 1926) (Indonesia, Borneo, Philippines)
- Archicolliuris tetraspilota (Schmidt-Goebel, 1846) (India, Myanmar)
