= Mimocolliuris =

Scientific classification
- Domain: Eukaryota
- Kingdom: Animalia
- Phylum: Arthropoda
- Class: Insecta
- Order: Coleoptera
- Suborder: Adephaga
- Family: Carabidae
- Subfamily: Lebiinae
- Tribe: Odacanthini
- Subtribe: Odacanthina
- Genus: Mimocolliuris; Liebke, 1933

Subgenera
- Essora Liebke, 1933; Mimocolliuris Liebke, 1933; Paramimocolliuris Habu, 1979

Genus of beetles

Mimocolliuris is a genus in the beetle family Carabidae. There are about 17 described species in Mimocolliuris.

== Species ==
These 17 species belong to the genus Mimocolliuris:

- Mimocolliuris andrewesi (Liebke, 1933) (Laos and Vietnam)
- Mimocolliuris astoni Baehr, 2016 (China)
- Mimocolliuris bakeri (Liebke, 1933) (Philippines)
- Mimocolliuris bicoloripes Baehr, 2016 (Nepal)
- Mimocolliuris chaudoiri (Boheman, 1858) (China, Thailand, and Vietnam)
- Mimocolliuris drumonti (Baehr, 2009) (Cambodia and Laos)
- Mimocolliuris hartmanni Baehr, 2016 (Vietnam)
- Mimocolliuris hiekei Baehr, 2016 (Nepal)
- Mimocolliuris indica Baehr, 2016 (India)
- Mimocolliuris insulana Habu, 1979 (China, Japan, and Taiwan)
- Mimocolliuris nepalensis (Jedlicka, 1965) (Nepal)
- Mimocolliuris pilifera (Nietner, 1858) (South and Southeast Asia)
- Mimocolliuris pusilla (Andrewes, 1930) (Vietnam, Indonesia, and Borneo)
- Mimocolliuris sauteri (Liebke, 1933) (Taiwan)
- Mimocolliuris sinuatiphallus Zhao & Tian, 2011 (China)
- Mimocolliuris stigma (Andrewes, 1923) (Sri Lanka)
- Mimocolliuris unimaculata Baehr, 2016 (Laos and Indonesia)
