= Eudalia =

Scientific classification
- Domain: Eukaryota
- Kingdom: Animalia
- Phylum: Arthropoda
- Class: Insecta
- Order: Coleoptera
- Suborder: Adephaga
- Family: Carabidae
- Subfamily: Lebiinae
- Tribe: Odacanthini
- Subtribe: Odacanthina
- Genus: Eudalia; Laporte, 1867

Genus of beetles

Eudalia is a genus in the beetle family Carabidae. There are about 13 described species in Eudalia, found in Australia.

== Species ==
These 13 species belong to the genus Eudalia:

- Eudalia atrata Baehr, 2005
- Eudalia castelnaui Sloane, 1910
- Eudalia femorata Baehr, 2005
- Eudalia latipennis (W.J.MacLeay, 1864)
- Eudalia liebherri Baehr, 2006
- Eudalia macleayi Bates, 1871
- Eudalia minor Baehr, 2005
- Eudalia monteithi Baehr, 2016
- Eudalia obliquiceps Sloane, 1917
- Eudalia punctipennis Baehr, 2005
- Eudalia reticulata Baehr, 2005
- Eudalia tamborineae Baehr, 2009
- Eudalia waterhousii Laporte, 1867
