= Gestroania =

Scientific classification
- Domain: Eukaryota
- Kingdom: Animalia
- Phylum: Arthropoda
- Class: Insecta
- Order: Coleoptera
- Suborder: Adephaga
- Family: Carabidae
- Subfamily: Lebiinae
- Tribe: Odacanthini
- Subtribe: Odacanthina
- Genus: Gestroania; Liebke, 1938

Genus of beetles

Gestroania is a genus in the ground beetle family Carabidae. There are at least four described species in Gestroania, found in Australia.

== Species ==
These four species belong to the genus Gestroania:

- Gestroania amplipennis (Gestro, 1875)
- Gestroania froggatti (W.J.MacLeay, 1888)
- Gestroania setipennis Baehr, 2005
- Gestroania storeyi Baehr, 2005
