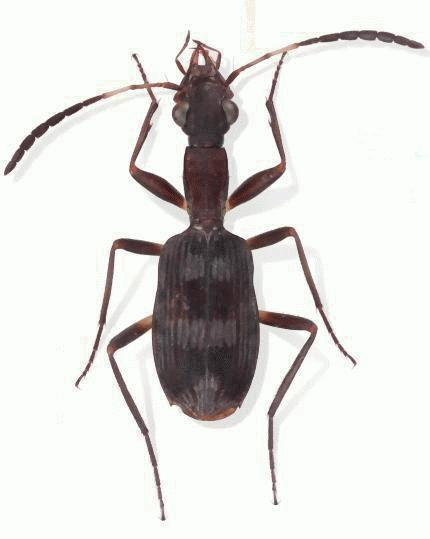
- Stenocheila lacordairei

Scientific classification
- Domain: Eukaryota
- Kingdom: Animalia
- Phylum: Arthropoda
- Class: Insecta
- Order: Coleoptera
- Suborder: Adephaga
- Family: Carabidae
- Tribe: Odacanthini
- Subtribe: Homethina
- Genus: Stenocheila; Laporte, 1832
- Species: S. lacordairei

Binomial name
- Stenocheila lacordairei Laporte, 1832

= Stenocheila =

Genus of beetles

Stenocheila is a genus in the beetle family Carabidae. This genus has a single species, Stenocheila lacordairei. It is found in French Guiana, Peru, and Brazil.
