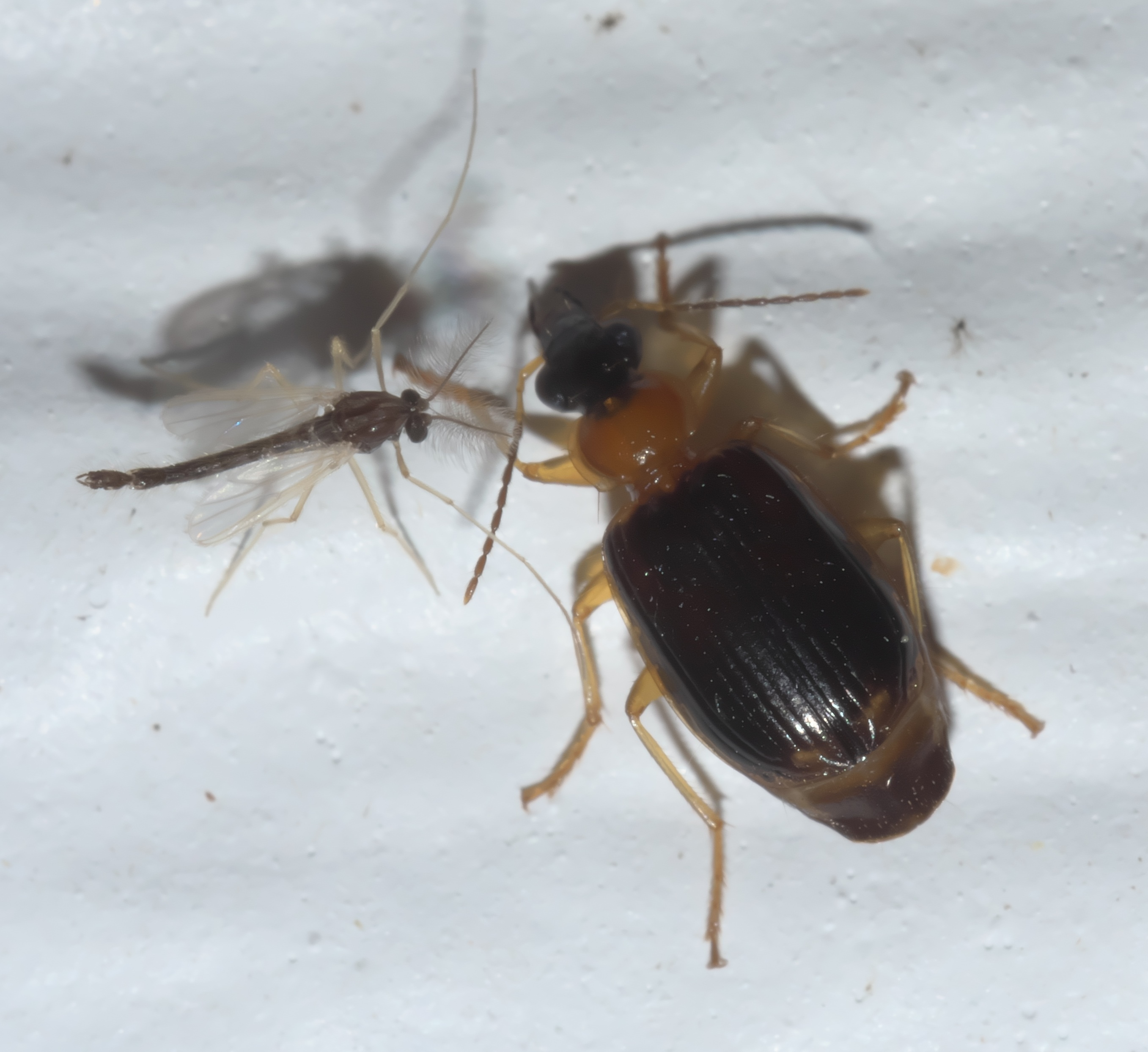
- Pentagonica picticornis

Scientific classification
- Domain: Eukaryota
- Kingdom: Animalia
- Phylum: Arthropoda
- Class: Insecta
- Order: Coleoptera
- Suborder: Adephaga
- Family: Carabidae
- Genus: Pentagonica
- Species: P. picticornis

Binomial name
- Pentagonica picticornis Bates, 1883

= Pentagonica picticornis =

Species of beetle

Pentagonica picticornis is a species of ground beetle in the family Carabidae. It is found in North America.
