= Pentagonica felix =

Scientific classification
- Domain: Eukaryota
- Kingdom: Animalia
- Phylum: Arthropoda
- Class: Insecta
- Order: Coleoptera
- Suborder: Adephaga
- Family: Carabidae
- Genus: Pentagonica
- Species: P. felix

Binomial name
- Pentagonica felix Bell, 1987

Species of beetle

Pentagonica felix is a species of ground beetle in the family Carabidae. It is found in Central America and North America.
