= Erectocolliuris =

Scientific classification
- Domain: Eukaryota
- Kingdom: Animalia
- Phylum: Arthropoda
- Class: Insecta
- Order: Coleoptera
- Suborder: Adephaga
- Family: Carabidae
- Subfamily: Lebiinae
- Tribe: Odacanthini
- Subtribe: Odacanthina
- Genus: Erectocolliuris; Liebke, 1931

Genus of beetles

Erectocolliuris is a genus in the ground beetle family Carabidae. There are about six described species in Erectocolliuris, found in Africa.

== Species ==
These six species belong to the genus Erectocolliuris:

- Erectocolliuris camerunica Basilewsky, 1970 (Cameroon)
- Erectocolliuris cyaneolimbata (Rousseau, 1900) (Cameroon, Congo, DR Congo, Kenya)
- Erectocolliuris fairmairei (Gestro, 1895) (Cameroon, DR Congo, Kenya, South Africa, Madagascar)
- Erectocolliuris garambae Basilewsky, 1965 (Senegal/Gambia, Ivory Coast, DR Congo)
- Erectocolliuris mirei Basilewsky, 1970 (Cameroon)
- Erectocolliuris wittei (Burgeon, 1937) (Ivory Coast, DR Congo)
