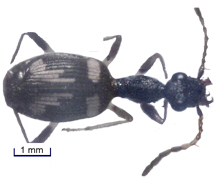
- Smeringocera, Botswana

Scientific classification
- Domain: Eukaryota
- Kingdom: Animalia
- Phylum: Arthropoda
- Class: Insecta
- Order: Coleoptera
- Suborder: Adephaga
- Family: Carabidae
- Subfamily: Lebiinae
- Tribe: Odacanthini
- Subtribe: Odacanthina
- Genus: Smeringocera; Chaudoir, 1863

Synonyms
- Amoebaea Péringuey, 1896; Nothochalybe Maindron, 1906

= Smeringocera =

Genus of beetles

Smeringocera is a genus in the ground beetle family Carabidae. There are about six described species in Smeringocera, found in Africa.

== Species ==
These six species belong to the genus Smeringocera:

- Smeringocera baenningeri Liebke, 1929 (Tanzania, Mozambique)
- Smeringocera convexa Mateu, 1966 (Chad)
- Smeringocera gestroi Alluaud, 1915 (Somalia)
- Smeringocera lineola (Dejean, 1831) (Mauretania, Senegal/Gambia)
- Smeringocera mashuna (Péringuey, 1896) (Mozambique, Zimbabwe, South Africa)
- Smeringocera nigeriana Liebke, 1938 (Guinea-Bissau, Mali, Ivory Coast, Burkina Faso, Nigeria, Chad, Uganda)
