= Andrewesia =

Scientific classification
- Domain: Eukaryota
- Kingdom: Animalia
- Phylum: Arthropoda
- Class: Insecta
- Order: Coleoptera
- Suborder: Adephaga
- Family: Carabidae
- Subfamily: Lebiinae
- Tribe: Odacanthini
- Subtribe: Odacanthina
- Genus: Andrewesia; Liebke, 1938

Genus of beetles

Andrewesia is a genus in the beetle family Carabidae. There are at least three described species in Andrewesia.

== Species ==
These three species belong to the genus Andrewesia:

- Andrewesia apicalis (Chaudoir, 1872) (Southeast Asia)
- Andrewesia australica Baehr, 2009 (Australia)
- Andrewesia obesa (Andrewes, 1923) (Indomalaya)
