= Porocara =

Scientific classification
- Kingdom: Animalia
- Phylum: Arthropoda
- Class: Insecta
- Order: Coleoptera
- Suborder: Adephaga
- Family: Carabidae
- Subfamily: Lebiinae
- Tribe: Odacanthini
- Subtribe: Odacanthina
- Genus: Porocara; Sloane, 1917

Genus of beetles

Porocara is a genus of ground beetles in the family Carabidae. There are about five described species in Porocara, found in Australia.

== Species ==
These five species belong to the genus Porocara:

- Porocara glabrata Baehr, 1986
- Porocara nigricollis Baehr, 1986
- Porocara occidentalis Baehr, 1986
- Porocara punctata Sloane, 1917
- Porocara ulrichi Baehr, 1996
