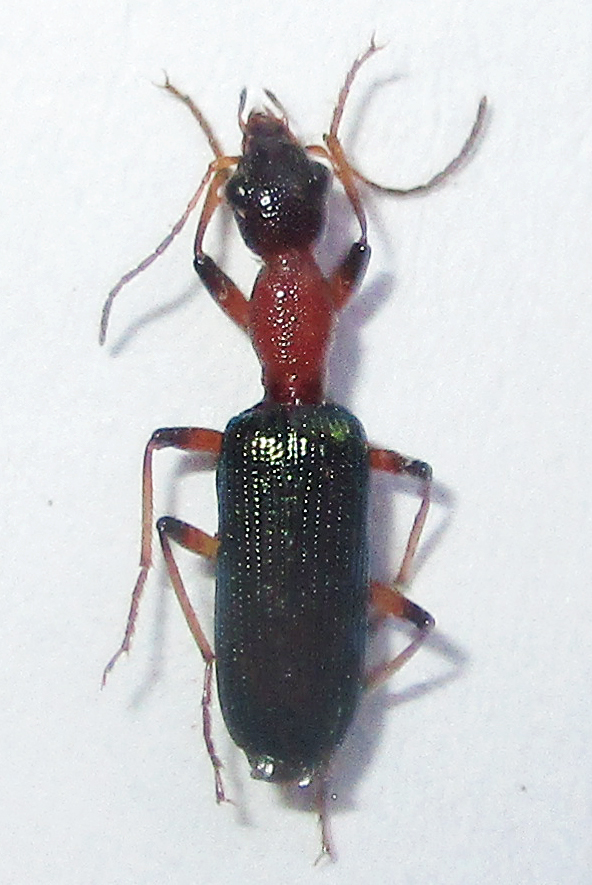
- Stenidia, Botswana

Scientific classification
- Domain: Eukaryota
- Kingdom: Animalia
- Phylum: Arthropoda
- Class: Insecta
- Order: Coleoptera
- Suborder: Adephaga
- Family: Carabidae
- Subfamily: Lebiinae
- Tribe: Odacanthini
- Subtribe: Odacanthina
- Genus: Stenidia; Brullé, 1834

= Stenidia =

Genus of beetles

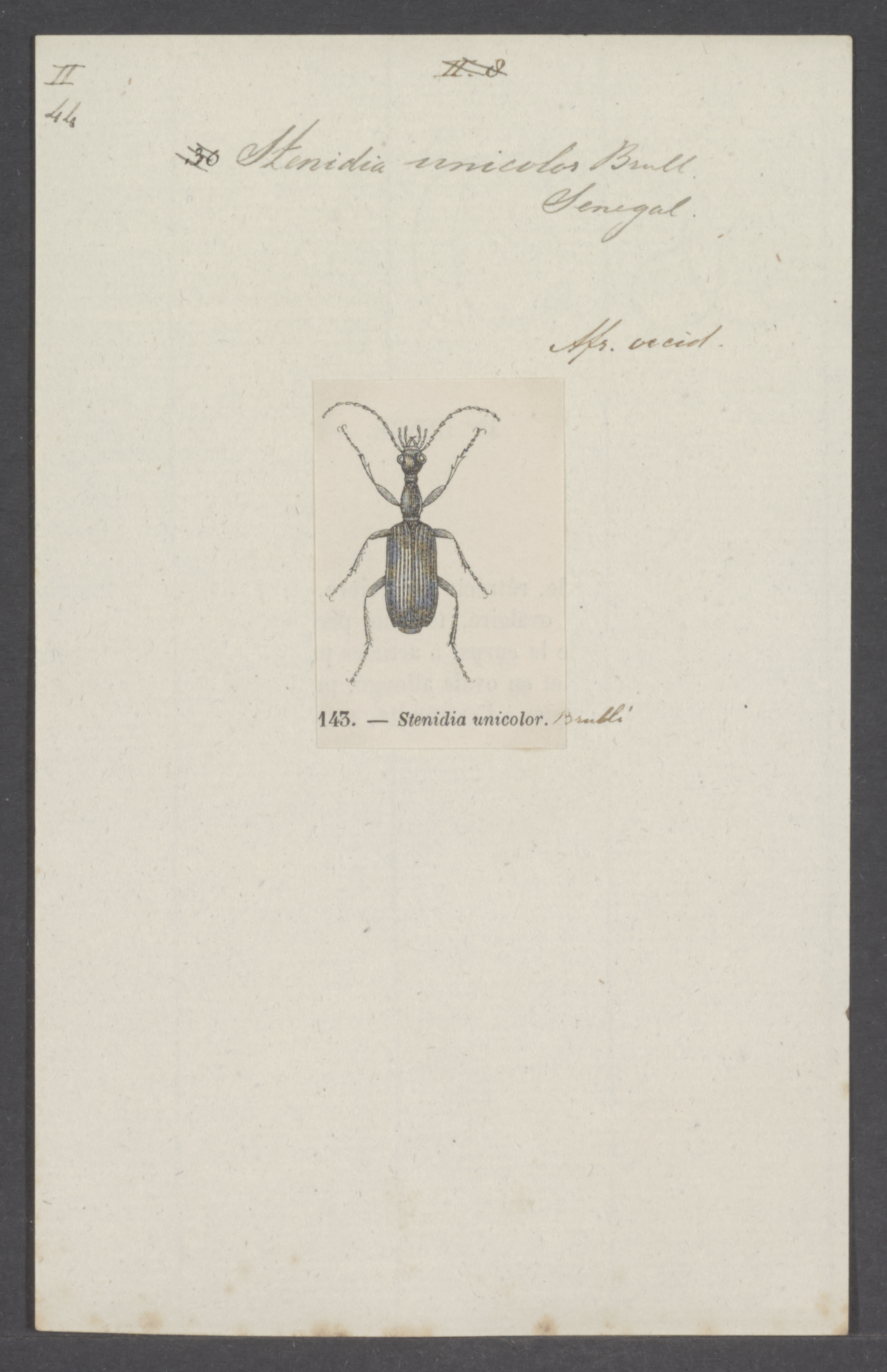

Stenidia is a genus in the ground beetle family Carabidae. There are more than 20 described species in Stenidia, found in Africa.

== Species ==
These 21 species belong to the genus Stenidia:

- Stenidia abdominalis Chaudoir, 1862 (South Africa)
- Stenidia angulata Liebke, 1933 (DR Congo, Kenya, Zambia)
- Stenidia angusta Péringuey, 1896 (DR Congo, Zambia, Zimbabwe)
- Stenidia approximans Barker, 1919 (South Africa)
- Stenidia bicolor Alluaud, 1936 (Madagascar)
- Stenidia blanda LaFerté-Sénectère, 1849 (Senegal/Gambia, Guinea)
- Stenidia corrusca LaFerté-Sénectère, 1849 (Senegal/Gambia, Sudan)
- Stenidia edwardsii Laporte, 1843 (Mauretania, Senegal/Gambia, Mali, Burkina Faso)
- Stenidia elegantula Péringuey, 1896 (DR Congo, Mozambique, Zimbabwe, South Africa)
- Stenidia fraterna Péringuey, 1896 (Mozambique)
- Stenidia hovana Fairmaire, 1884 (Madagascar)
- Stenidia jucunda Péringuey, 1896 (Zambia, Mozambique, Zimbabwe, South Africa)
- Stenidia lenta Liebke, 1938 (Cameroon, Congo)
- Stenidia mareei Basilewsky, 1949 (DR Congo)
- Stenidia metallica Burgeon, 1937 (Cameroon, DR Congo, Rwanda, Burundi)
- Stenidia nigricollis Basilewsky, 1970 (Cameroon)
- Stenidia quadricollis Chaudoir, 1872 (Botswana)
- Stenidia rugicollis (Fairmaire, 1897) (Madagascar)
- Stenidia spinipennis Putzeys, 1880 (Ivory Coast, Angola, Zambia)
- Stenidia unicolor Brullé, 1834 (Mauretania, Senegal/Gambia, Mali, Burkina Faso, Sudan, DR Congo)
- Stenidia viridis Liebke, 1933 (Sudan, Kenya, Tanzania, Zambia, Malawi, Zimbabwe)
