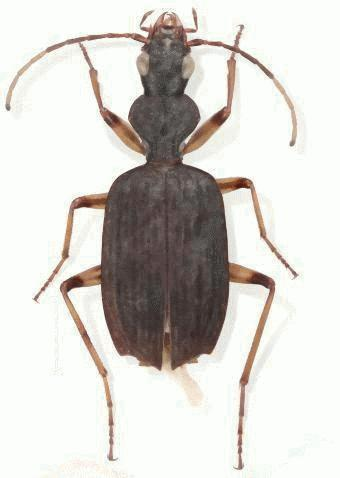

Scientific classification
- Kingdom: Animalia
- Phylum: Arthropoda
- Class: Insecta
- Order: Coleoptera
- Suborder: Adephaga
- Family: Carabidae
- Subfamily: Lebiinae
- Genus: Aeolodermus; Andrewes, 1929
- Species: A. emarginatus

Binomial name
- Aeolodermus emarginatus (Chaudoir, 1872)

= Aeolodermus =

Aeolodermus emarginatus

Genus of beetles

Aeolodermus emarginatus is a species of beetles in the family Carabidae, the only species in the genus Aeolodermus.
