= Basistichus =

Basistichus micans

Scientific classification
- Kingdom: Animalia
- Phylum: Arthropoda
- Class: Insecta
- Order: Coleoptera
- Suborder: Adephaga
- Family: Carabidae
- Subfamily: Lebiinae
- Genus: Basistichus; Sloane, 1917
- Species: B. micans

Binomial name
- Basistichus micans Macleay, 1864

Genus of beetles

Basistichus micans is a species of beetle in the family Carabidae, the only species in the genus Basistichus.
