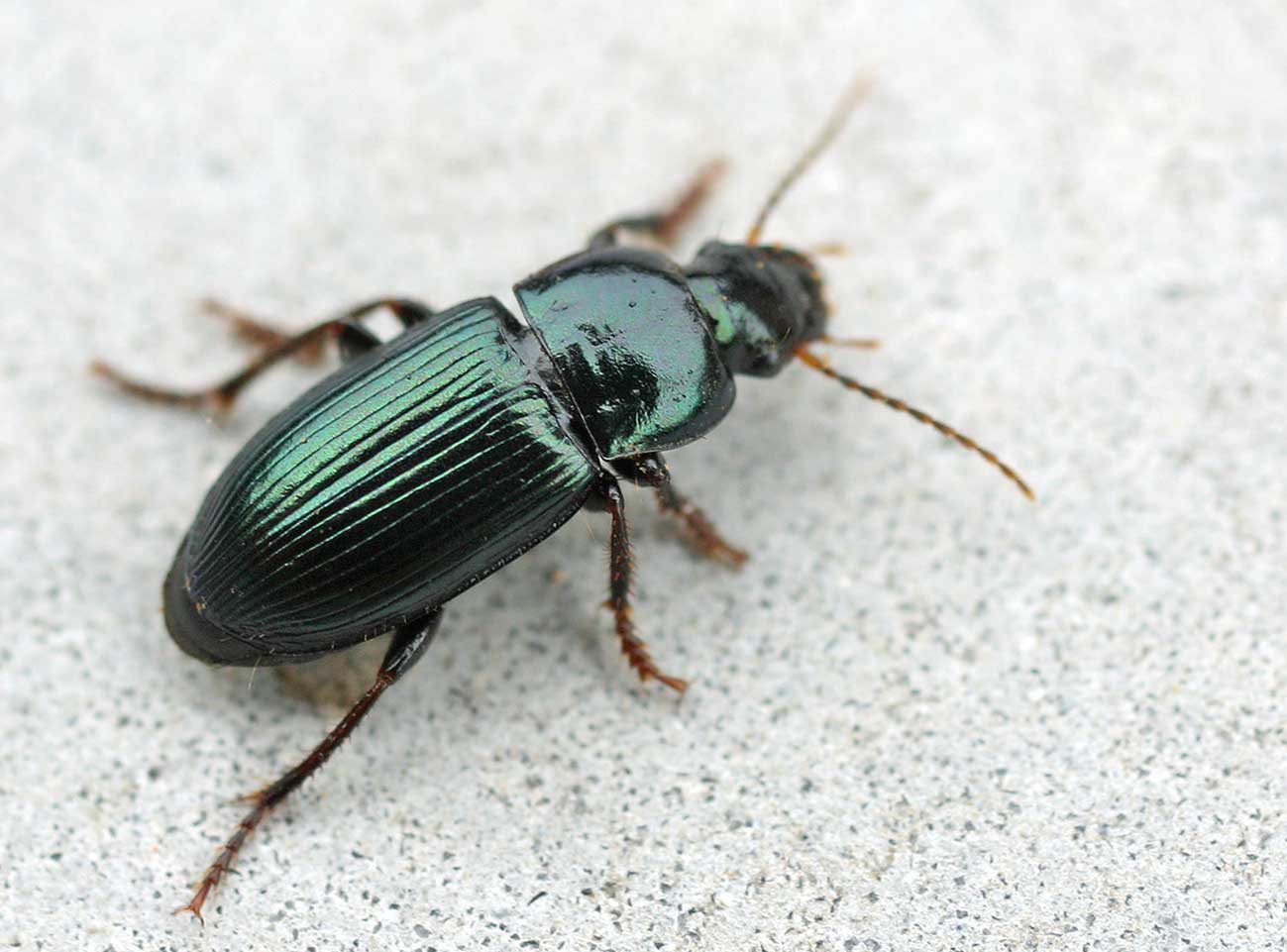

Scientific classification
- Kingdom: Animalia
- Phylum: Arthropoda
- Clade: Pancrustacea
- Class: Insecta
- Order: Coleoptera
- Suborder: Adephaga
- Family: Carabidae
- Genus: Harpalus
- Species: H. affinis

Binomial name
- Harpalus affinis (Schrank, 1781)

= Harpalus affinis =

Species of beetle

Harpalus affinis is a species of ground beetle native to the Palearctic, and introduced in the Nearctic and the Australasian region. In Europe, it is only absent in the following countries or islands: the Azores, the Canary Islands, the Channel Islands, Crete, Cyclades, Dodecanese, the Faroe Islands, Franz Josef Land, Gibraltar, Iceland, Madeira, Malta, Monaco, the North Aegean islands, Novaya Zemlya, San Marino, the Savage Islands, Sicily, Svalbard and Jan Mayen, and Vatican City. Its presence on the Balearic Islands and Sardinia is doubtful.

== Description ==
The species is 8.5–12 millimetres (0.33–0.47 in) long and is black coloured with colourful metallic reflections on its shin. Their surface is metallic bronze, green or blue coloured.

== Distribution ==
Harpalus affinis is present in the Palearctic realm, from Europe to Siberia. It was introduced in North America and is now present in several Canadian provinces, from British Columbia to the Maritimes. It became established in New Zealand in the mid to late 1970s.

== Larva ==
The newly hatched larvae are termite-formed. The process of hatching is happening in mid-May. When hatched, the larvae measure 4mm in length and have orange and small head. The abdomen is dark grey at the end, and bigger. The second instar larva is around 10 mm, with large dark orange mandibles and the head, and pronotum. The abdomen is light grey and more different than the larva of H. pensylvanicus and H. capito, who are darker. Legs with big and orange tarsi. The development lasts for three months https://upload.wikimedia.org/wikipedia/commons/4/4e/Newly_hatched_larva.jpg

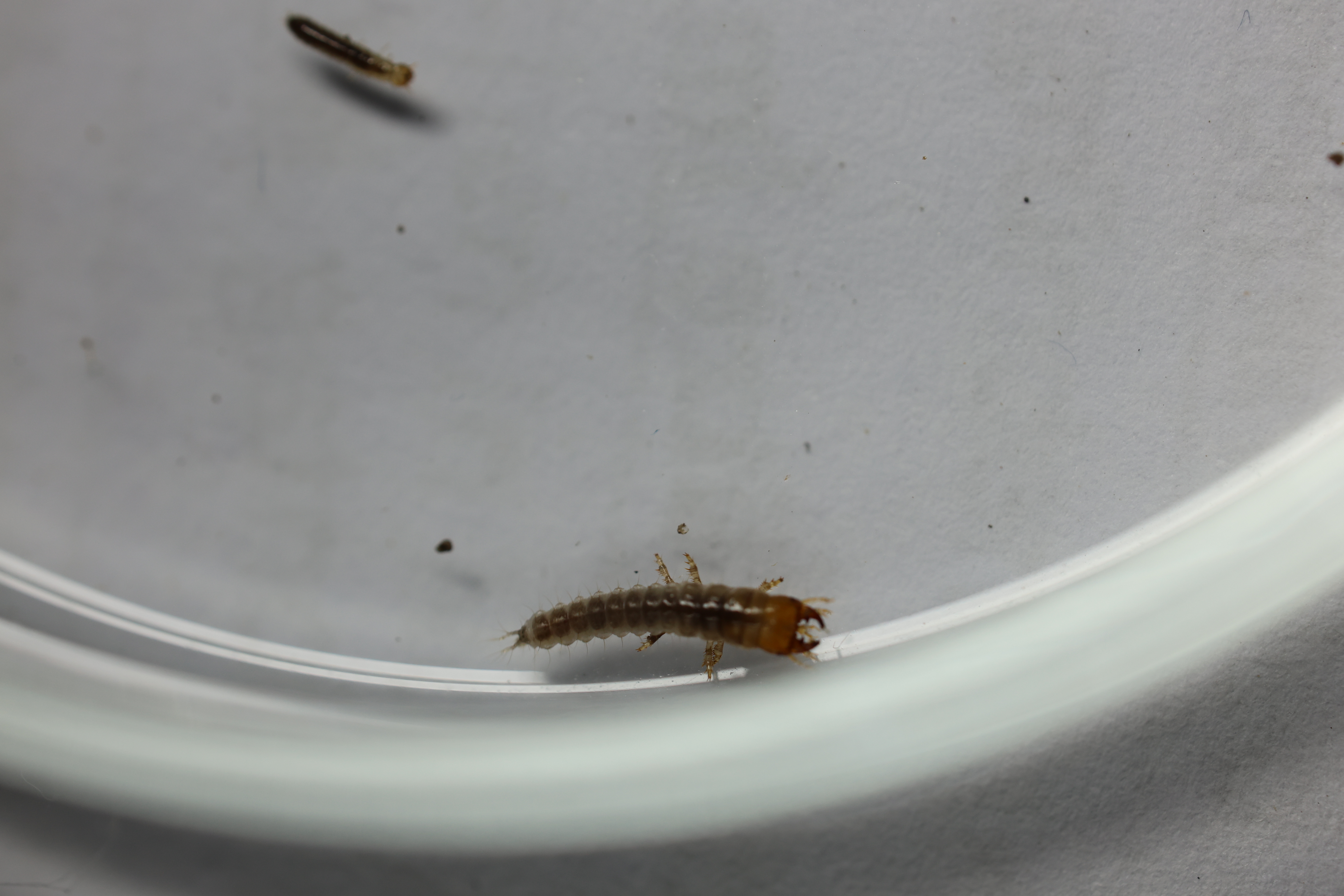
Second instar larva
