= Aulacolius =

Aulacolius triordinatus

Scientific classification
- Kingdom: Animalia
- Phylum: Arthropoda
- Class: Insecta
- Order: Coleoptera
- Suborder: Adephaga
- Family: Carabidae
- Subfamily: Lebiinae
- Genus: Aulacolius; Sloane, 1923
- Species: A. triordinatus

Binomial name
- Aulacolius triordinatus Sloane, 1923

Genus of beetles

Aulacolius triordinatus is a species of beetle in the family Carabidae, the only species in the genus Aulacolius.
