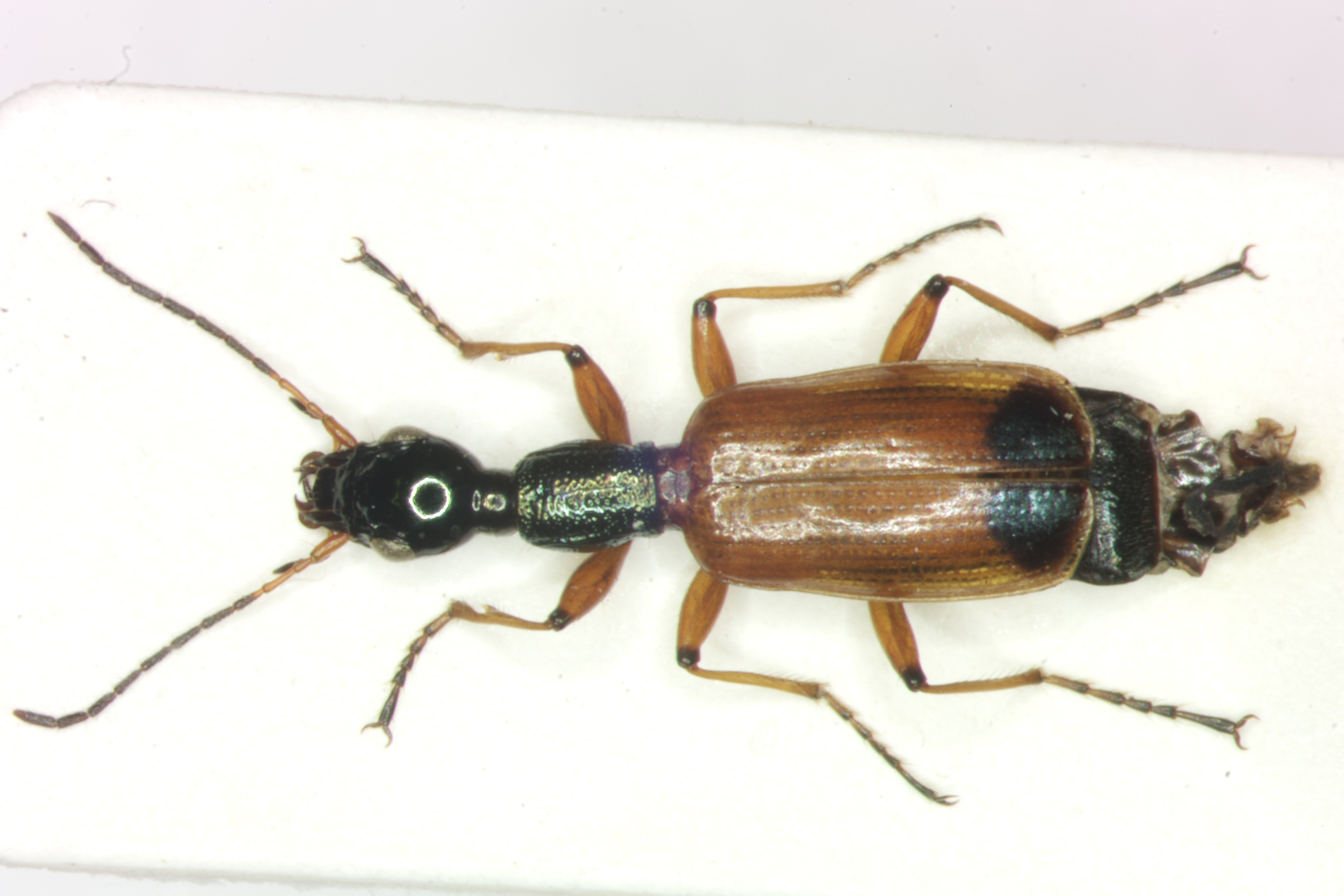
- Odacantha melanura

Scientific classification
- Kingdom: Animalia
- Phylum: Arthropoda
- Class: Insecta
- Order: Coleoptera
- Suborder: Adephaga
- Family: Carabidae
- Subfamily: Lebiinae
- Genus: Odacantha; Paykull, 1798

= Odacantha =

Genus of beetles

Odacantha is a genus of ground beetle native to the Palearctic (including Europe) and the Near East. It contains the following species:

- Odacantha aegrota Bates, 1883
- Odacantha chinensis Jedlicka, 1963
- Odacantha composita Liebke, 1938
- Odacantha cyanea Laferte-Senectere, 1849
- Odacantha flavipennis Liebke, 1931
- Odacantha hagai Nemoto, 1989
- Odacantha insulicola Basilewsky, 1977
- Odacantha laportei Chaudoir, 1848
- Odacantha melanura (Linnaeus, 1767)
- Odacantha metallica Fairmaire, 1889
- Odacantha pomposa Liebke, 1933
- Odacantha puziloi Solsky, 1875
- Odacantha seriepunctata Chaudoir, 1878
- Odacantha subcomposita Basilewsky, 1970
- Odacantha swazina Basilewsky, 1965
