= Anasis =

Anasis howitti

Scientific classification
- Kingdom: Animalia
- Phylum: Arthropoda
- Class: Insecta
- Order: Coleoptera
- Suborder: Adephaga
- Family: Carabidae
- Subfamily: Lebiinae
- Genus: Anasis; Castelnau, 1867
- Species: A. howitti

Binomial name
- Anasis howitti Castelnau, 1867

Genus of beetles

Anasis howitti is a species of beetle in the family Carabidae, the only species in the genus Anasis.
