= Cyphocoleus =

Scientific classification
- Kingdom: Animalia
- Phylum: Mollusca
- Class: Gastropoda
- Subclass: Caenogastropoda
- Family: Litiopidae
- Genus: Cyphocoleus; Chaudoir, 1877

Synonyms
- Atongolium Park & Will, 2008

Genus of beetles

Cyphocoleus is a genus of beetles in the family Carabidae, containing 22 species.
