= Asios vindex =

Scientific classification
- Kingdom: Animalia
- Phylum: Arthropoda
- Class: Insecta
- Order: Coleoptera
- Suborder: Adephaga
- Family: Carabidae
- Subfamily: Lebiinae
- Tribe: Odacanthini
- Subtribe: Odacanthina
- Genus: Asios; Liebke, 1933
- Species: A. vindex

Binomial name
- Asios vindex Liebke, 1933

Species of beetle

Asios vindex is a species of beetle in the family Carabidae, the only species in the genus Asios.
