= Clarencia (beetle) =

Scientific classification
- Kingdom: Animalia
- Phylum: Arthropoda
- Class: Insecta
- Order: Coleoptera
- Suborder: Adephaga
- Family: Carabidae
- Subfamily: Lebiinae
- Genus: Clarencia; Sloane, 1917

Genus of beetles

Clarencia is a genus of beetles in the family Carabidae, containing the following species:

- Clarencia aliena (Pascoe, 1860)
- Clarencia angusticollis (Macleay, 1888)
- Clarencia breviceps Baehr, 2005
- Clarencia papua Darlington, 1968
- Clarencia quadridens Darlington, 1968
