= Eucolliuris =

Scientific classification
- Kingdom: Animalia
- Phylum: Arthropoda
- Class: Insecta
- Order: Coleoptera
- Suborder: Adephaga
- Family: Carabidae
- Subfamily: Lebiinae
- Genus: Eucolliuris; Liebke, 1931

Genus of beetles

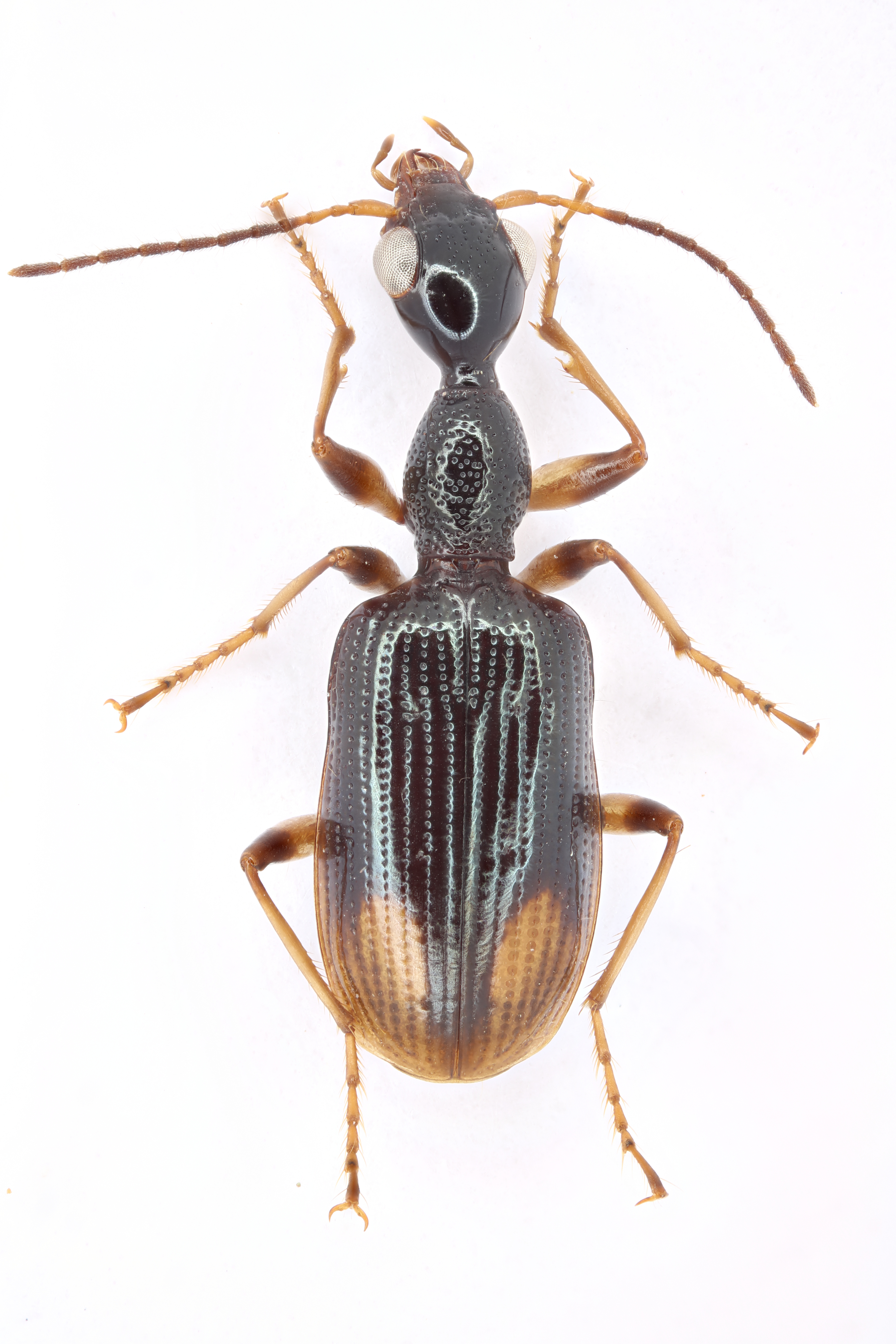
Carabidae, Eucolliuris aethiopica (Raffray, 1885); Mozambique

Eucolliuris is a genus of beetles in the family Carabidae, containing the following species:

- Eucolliuris aegyptiaca Jedlicka, 1960
- Eucolliuris aethiopica (Raffray, 1885)
- Eucolliuris amoenula (Peringuey, 1896)
- Eucolliuris angolensis (Peringuey, 1896)
- Eucolliuris brachydera (Alluaud, 1918)
- Eucolliuris brunneomarginata (Rousseau, 1900)
- Eucolliuris capicola (Peringuey, 1896)
- Eucolliuris celebensis (Gestro, 1875)
- Eucolliuris cribriceps (Bates, 1889)
- Eucolliuris cribrifrons (Liebke, 1931)
- Eucolliuris cyanauges (Andrewes, 1936)
- Eucolliuris decorsei (Alluaud, 1917)
- Eucolliuris dissimilis Basilewsky, 1965
- Eucolliuris dorsalis (Peringuey, 1896)
- Eucolliuris fukiensis Jedlicka, 1953
- Eucolliuris fulvipennis (Chaudoir, 1872)
- Eucolliuris fuscipennis Chaudoir, 1850
- Eucolliuris globulicollis Jeannel, 1948
- Eucolliuris interrupta (Fairmaire, 1885)
- Eucolliuris kivuensis Basilewsky, 1965
- Eucolliuris labathiei Jeannel, 1948
- Eucolliuris latifascia Chaudoir, 1872
- Eucolliuris litura Schmidt-Gobel, 1846
- Eucolliuris madagascariensis (Alluaud, 1899)
- Eucolliuris natalensis (Chaudoir, 1862)
- Eucolliuris olivierii (Buquet, 1864)
- Eucolliuris rossi (Darlington, 1968)
- Eucolliuris suturalis (Peringuey, 1896)
- Eucolliuris usherae Basilewsky, 1965
- Eucolliuris virgulifera (Chaudoir, 1872)
