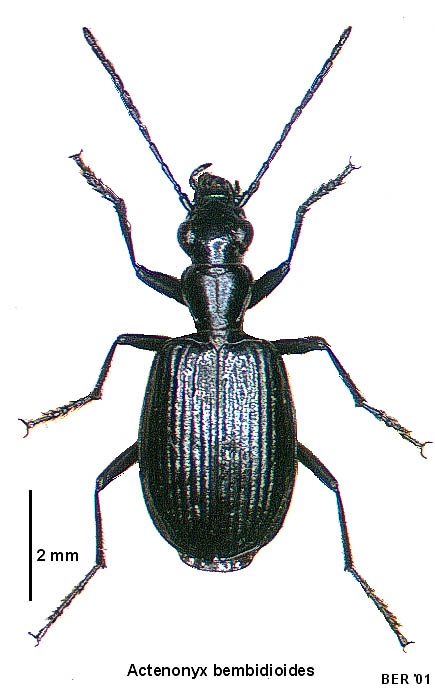

Scientific classification
- Kingdom: Animalia
- Phylum: Arthropoda
- Clade: Pancrustacea
- Class: Insecta
- Order: Coleoptera
- Suborder: Adephaga
- Family: Carabidae
- Subfamily: Lebiinae
- Tribe: Lebiini
- Subtribe: Actenonycina
- Genus: Actenonyx; White, 1846
- Species: A. bembidioides

Binomial name
- Actenonyx bembidioides White, 1846

= Actenonyx =

Genus of beetles

Actenonyx is a genus of beetles in the family Carabidae. At present only species in this genus is Actenonyx bembidioides. However, it has been suggested that a taxonomic revision of this genus is needed as there are two species that await description. David Kavanaugh researched this beetle genus in a comprehensive study published in 2022, making the case for a new species. This genus and species was first described by Adam White and is endemic to New Zealand.

== Distribution ==
In Kavanaugh's study, he found that the genus was widely distributed on New Zealand's North and South Islands but not found on Stewart Island or other offshore islands.
