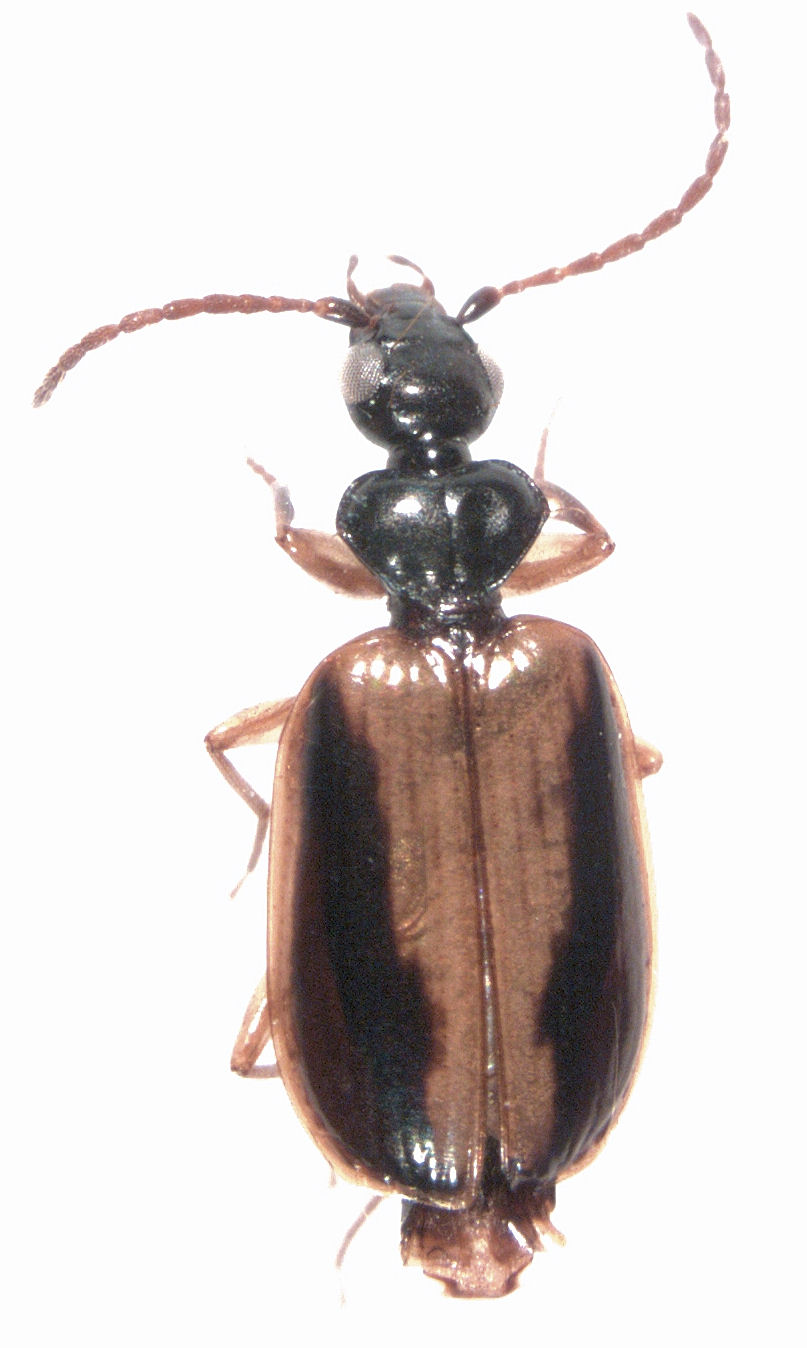
- Pentagonica vittipennis

Scientific classification
- Domain: Eukaryota
- Kingdom: Animalia
- Phylum: Arthropoda
- Class: Insecta
- Order: Coleoptera
- Suborder: Adephaga
- Family: Carabidae
- Subfamily: Harpalinae
- Tribe: Pentagonicini; Bates, 1873

= Pentagonicini =

Tribe of beetles

Pentagonicini is a tribe of ground beetles in the family Carabidae. There is at least one genus and about 10 described species in Pentagonicini.
