= Balazucellus =

Balazucellus hubeicola

Scientific classification
- Kingdom: Animalia
- Phylum: Arthropoda
- Class: Insecta
- Order: Coleoptera
- Suborder: Adephaga
- Family: Carabidae
- Subfamily: Trechinae
- Genus: Balazucellus; Deuve, 2001
- Species: B. hubeicola

Binomial name
- Balazucellus hubeicola Deuve, 2001

Genus of beetles

Balazucellus hubeicola is a species of beetle in the family Carabidae, the only species in the genus Balazucellus.
