= Mamesdytes =

Scientific classification
- Kingdom: Animalia
- Phylum: Arthropoda
- Class: Insecta
- Order: Coleoptera
- Suborder: Adephaga
- Family: Carabidae
- Subfamily: Trechinae
- Genus: Mamesdytes; Trezzi, 2007

Genus of beetles

Mamesdytes is a genus of beetles in the family Carabidae, containing the following species:

- Mamesdytes glacialis Trezzi, 2007
- Mamesdytes shawcrossensis Trezzi, 2007
