= Bothynotrechus =

Scientific classification
- Kingdom: Animalia
- Phylum: Arthropoda
- Class: Insecta
- Order: Coleoptera
- Suborder: Adephaga
- Family: Carabidae
- Subfamily: Trechinae
- Genus: Bothynotrechus; Moore, 1972

Genus of beetles

Bothynotrechus is a genus of beetles in the family Carabidae, containing the following species:

- Bothynotrechus castelnaui (Sloane, 1920)
- Bothynotrechus lynx Moore, 1972
