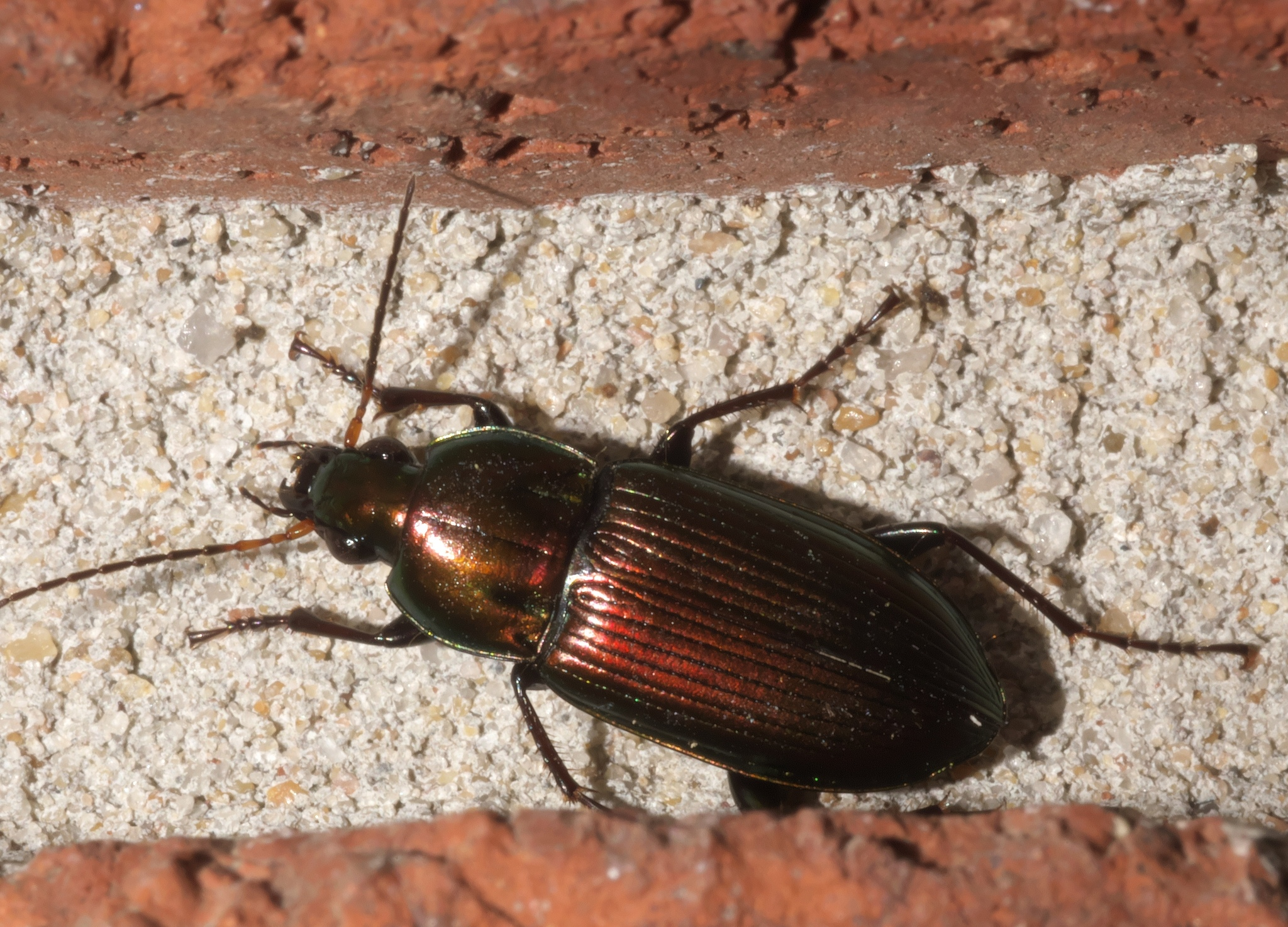
- Poecilus chalcites, Oklahoma

Scientific classification
- Domain: Eukaryota
- Kingdom: Animalia
- Phylum: Arthropoda
- Class: Insecta
- Order: Coleoptera
- Suborder: Adephaga
- Family: Carabidae
- Subfamily: Pterostichinae
- Tribe: Pterostichini; Bonelli, 1810

Subtribes
- Abacetina Chaudoir, 1873; Euchroina Chaudoir, 1874; Loxandrina Erwin & Sims, 1984; Metiina Straneo, 1951; Pterostichina Bonelli, 1810

Diversity
- at least 180 genera

= Pterostichini =

Tribe of beetles

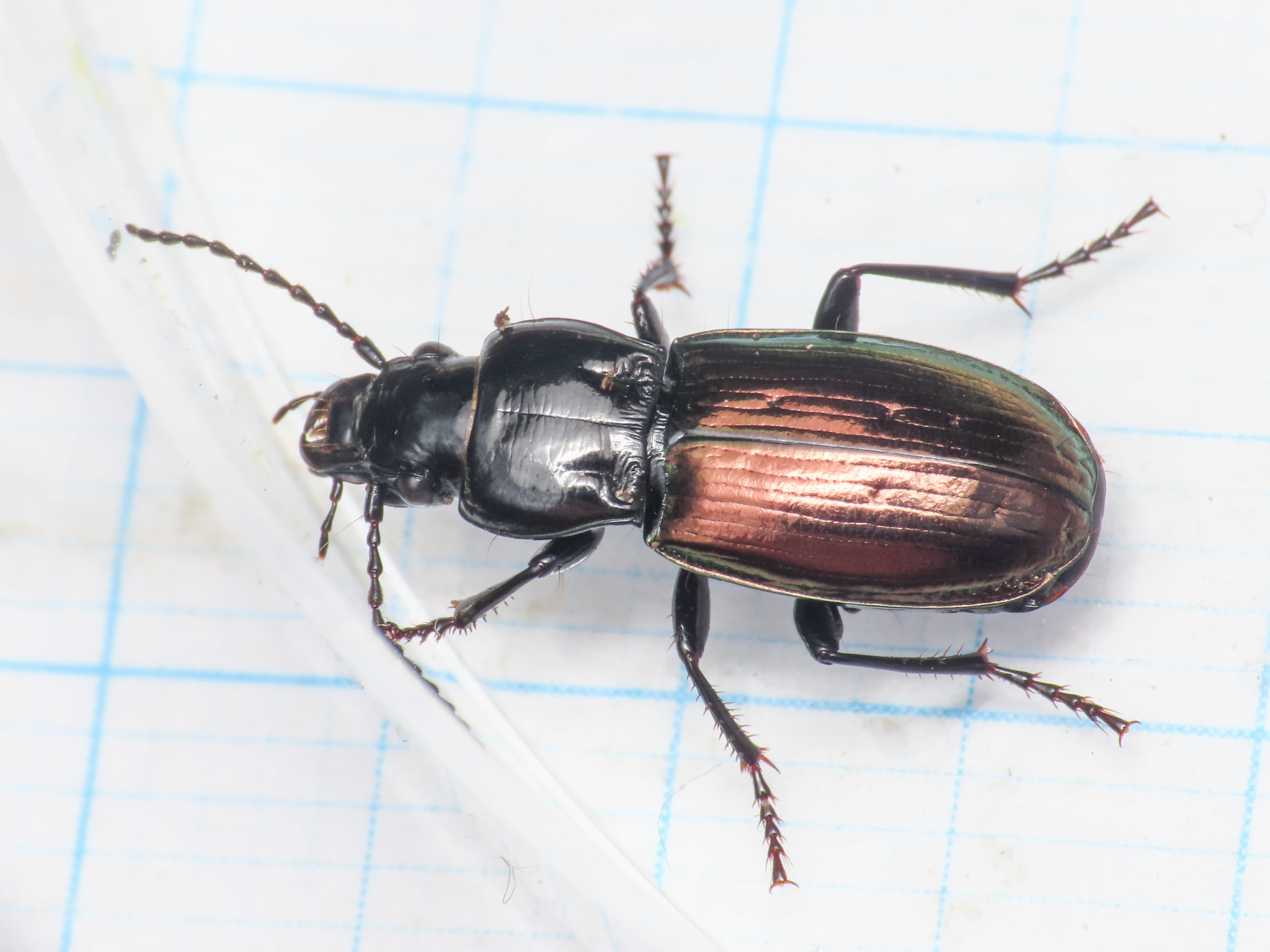
Pterostichus bicolor, Italy

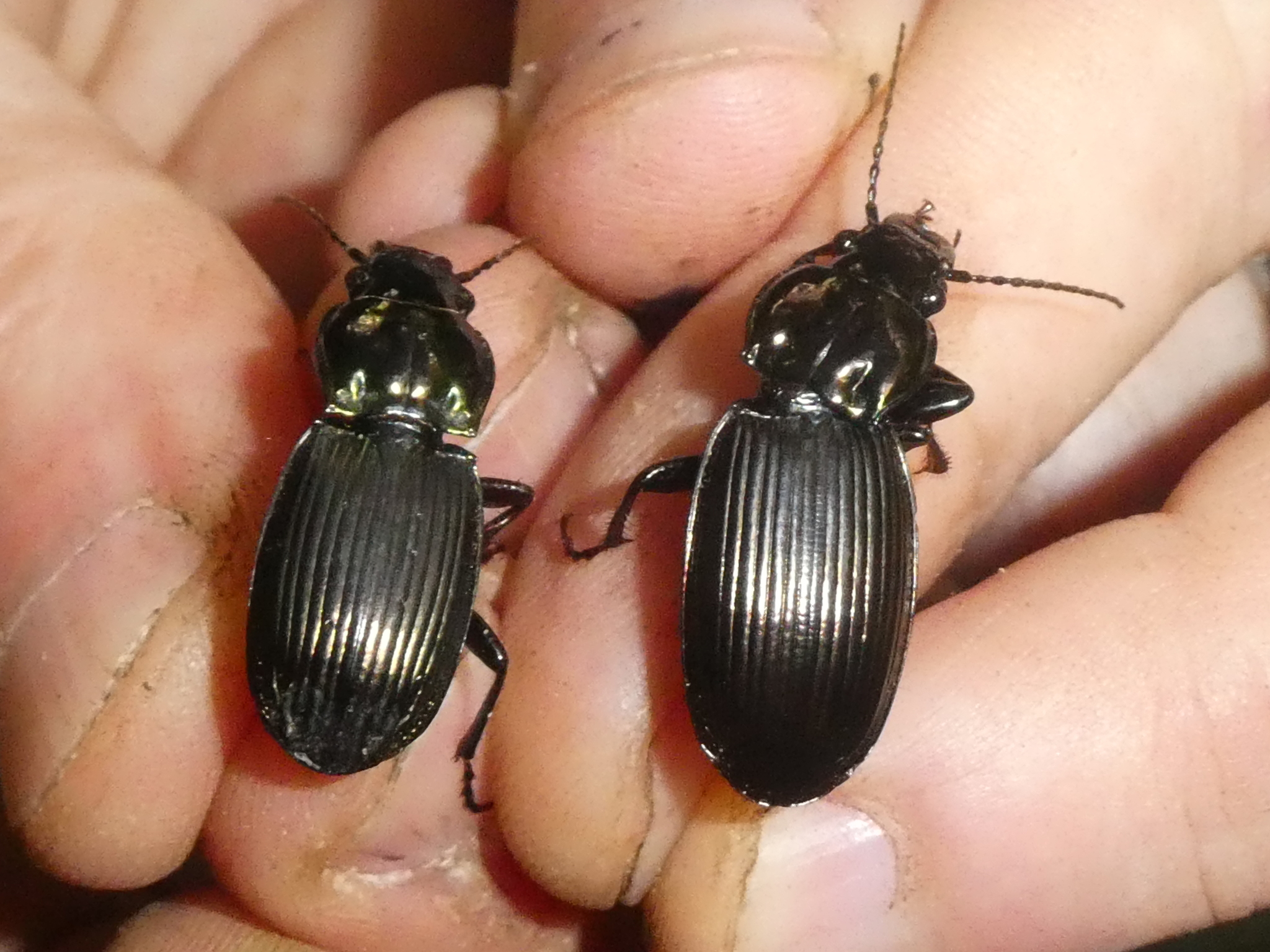
Megadromus bucolicus, New Zealand

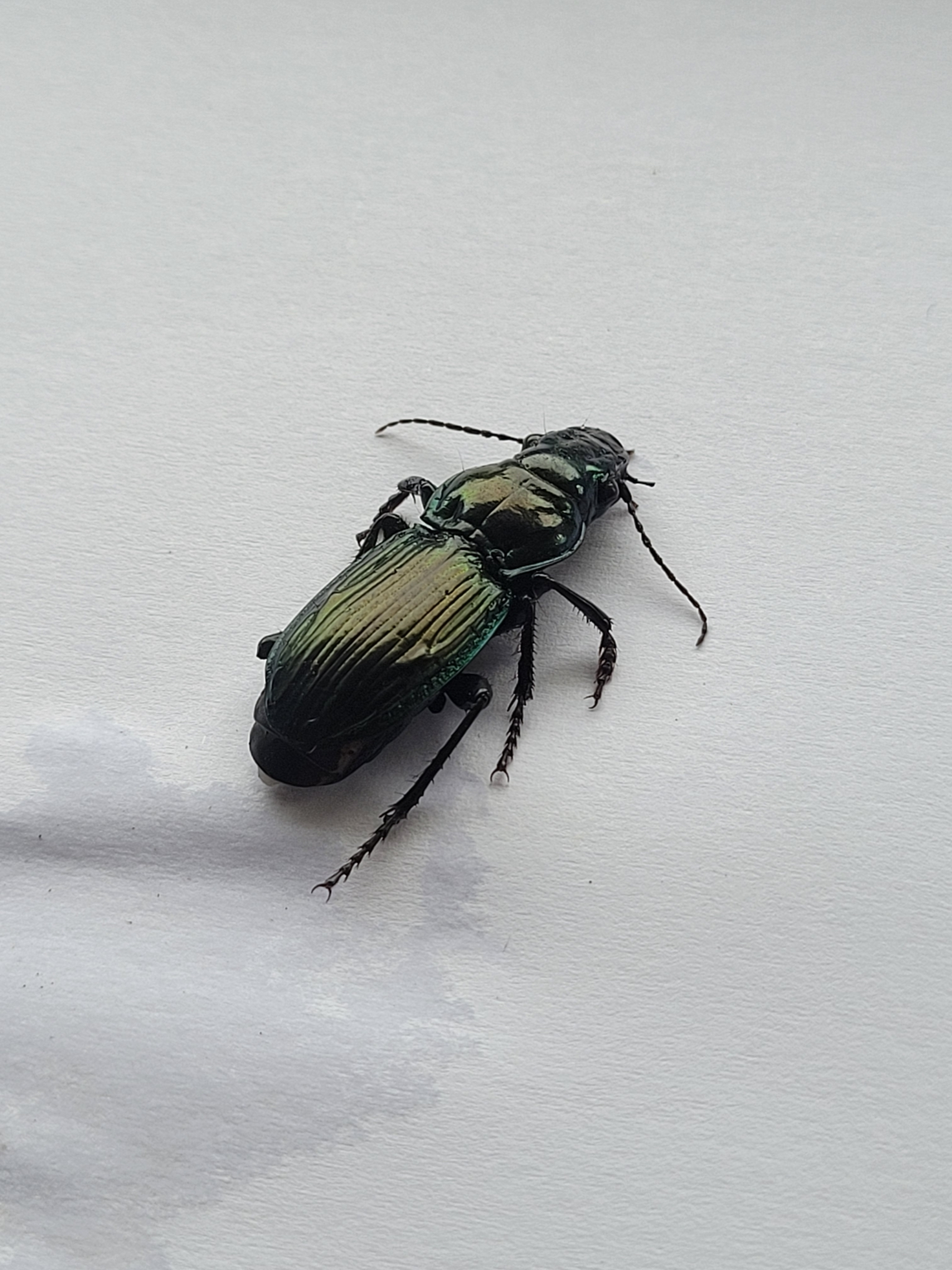
Megadromus antarcticus, New Zealand

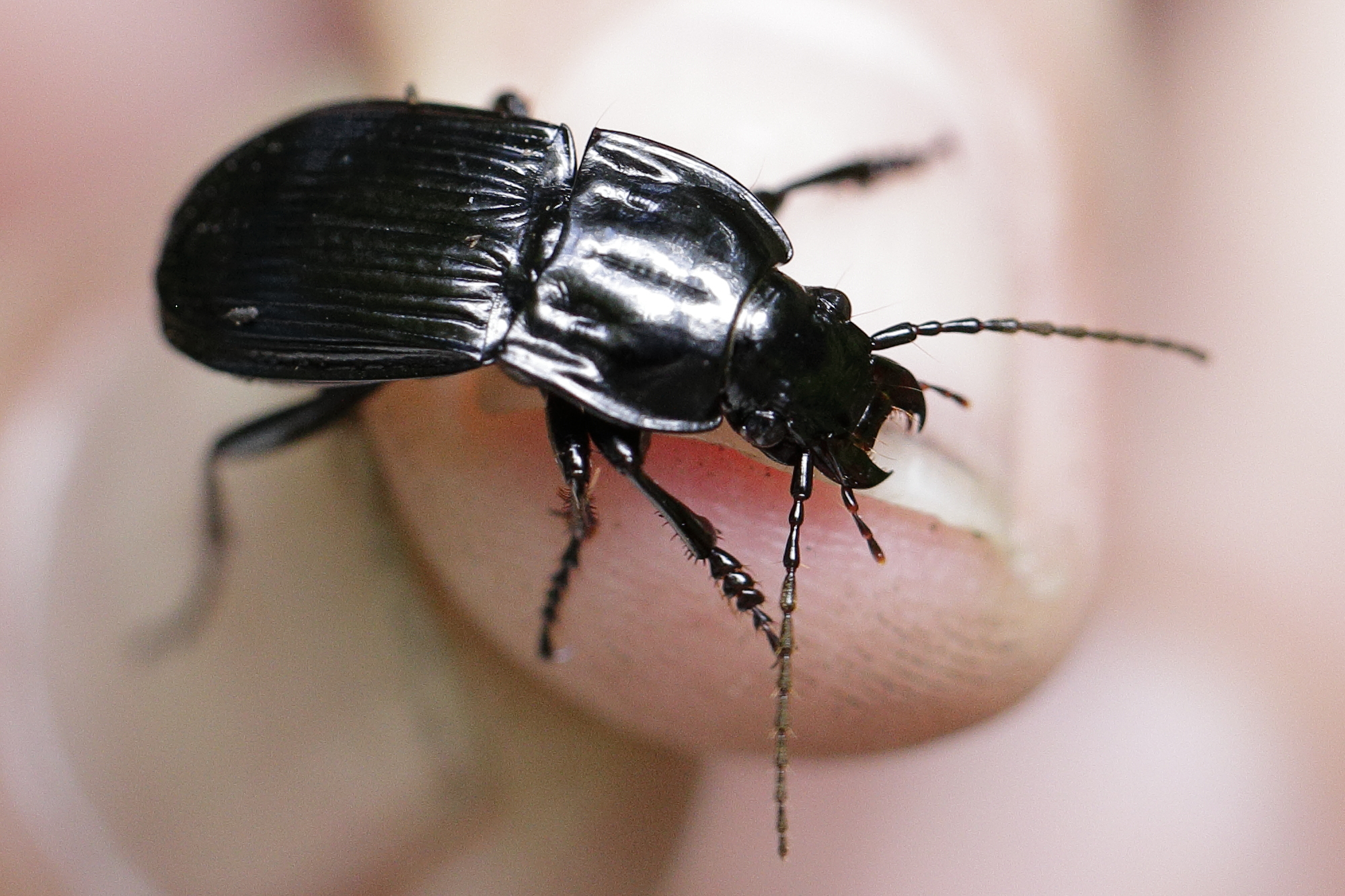
Abax parallelepipedus, Germany

Pterostichini is a tribe of ground beetles in the subfamily Harpalinae. There are about 180 genera and more than 3,800 described species in Pterostichini.

== Pterostichini genera ==
These 180 genera belong to Pterostichini:

Subtribe Abacetina Chaudoir, 1873
Abacaecus Allegro & Giachino, 2020
Abacetus Dejean, 1828
Aristopus LaFerté-Sénectère, 1853
Celioinkosa Straneo, 1951
Chlaeminus Motschulsky, 1865
Colpodichius Straneo, 1952
Cosmodiscus Sloane, 1907
Cyrtomoscelis Chaudoir, 1874
Distrigidius Jeannel, 1948
Ecnomolaus Bates, 1892
Haptoderidius Straneo, 1975
Haptoderodes Straneo, 1986
Holconotus Schmidt-Goebel, 1846
Inkosa Péringuey, 1926
Mateuellus Deuve, 1990
Metabacetus Bates, 1892
Metaxellus Straneo, 1960
Metaxys Chaudoir, 1857
Novillidius Straneo, 1941
Oodinkosa Straneo, 1939
Ophonichius Straneo, 1942
Pediomorphus Chaudoir, 1878
Pioprosopus Tschitscherine, 1899
Pollicobius Vinson, 1939
Prostalomus Basilewsky, 1950
Pseudabacetus Burgeon, 1935
Pterostillichus Straneo, 1949
Rhagadillius Straneo, 1951
Tiferonia Darlington, 1962
Trachelocyphoides Straneo, 1942
Trachelocyphus Tschitscherine, 1900
Subtribe Euchroina Chaudoir, 1874
Abacillius Straneo, 1949
Abacillodes Straneo, 1988
Abaris Dejean, 1831
Apsaustodon Tschitscherine, 1901
Argutoridius Chaudoir, 1876
Blennidus Motschulsky, 1866
Blenniventer Straneo, 1986
Bothynoproctus Tschitscherine, 1900
Cedrorum Borges & A.Serrano, 1993
Cephalostichus Straneo, 1977
Cynthidia Chaudoir, 1874
Euchroa Brullé, 1835
Eumara Tschitscherine, 1901
Gastrogmus Sloane, 1915
Haplobothynus Tschitscherine, 1901
Litarthrum Sloane, 1915
Lobobrachus Sharp, 1885
Marsyas Putzeys, 1845
Meropalpus Tschitscherine, 1900
Microcephalus Dejean, 1828
Neotalus Will, 2002
Oribazus Chaudoir, 1874
Orthomus Chaudoir, 1838
Pachythecus Chaudoir, 1874
Paniestichus Will, 2011
Parorthomus B.Gueorguiev; Wrase & Farkac, 2014
Phaenaulax Tschitscherine, 1898
Prosopogmus Chaudoir, 1865
Pseudabarys Chaudoir, 1874
Setalimorphus Sloane, 1895
Setalis Laporte, 1867
Simodontus Chaudoir, 1843
Trirammatus Chaudoir, 1835
Subtribe Loxandrina Erwin & Sims, 1984
Cerabilia Laporte, 1867
Oxycrepis Reiche, 1843
Zeodera Laporte, 1867
Subtribe Metiina Straneo, 1951
Abropus G.R.Waterhouse, 1842
Antarctiola Straneo, 1977
Feroniola Tschitscherine, 1900
Kuschelinus Straneo, 1963
Metius Curtis, 1839
Subtribe Pterostichina Bonelli, 1810
Abacidus LeConte, 1863
Abacoleptus Fauvel, 1903
Abacomorphus Chaudoir, 1878
Abacophrastus Will, 2011
Abacops Tschitscherine, 1902
Abax Bonelli, 1810
Allotriopus Bates, 1882
Analoma Darlington, 1971
Apophylon B.Gueorguiev & Sciaky, 2015
Aristochroa Tschitscherine, 1898
Aristochroodes Marcilhac, 1993
Aulacopodus Britton, 1940
Basilewskya Straneo, 1948
Camptoscelis Dejean, 1828
Castelnaudia Tschitscherine, 1891
Catadromus W.S.MacLeay, 1825
Chaetauchenium Tschitscherine, 1900
Chalcochrous Chaudoir, 1838
Cophosomorpha Tschitscherine, 1891
Cratoferonia Tschitscherine, 1902
Cratogaster Blanchard, 1843
Cuneipectus Sloane, 1907
Cyclotrachelus Chaudoir, 1838
Cyrtoderus Hope, 1842
Darodilia Laporte, 1867
Delinius Westwood, 1864
Eucamptognathus Chaudoir, 1837
Eudromus Klug, 1835
Euryabax Fauvel, 1903
Euryaptus Bates, 1892
Eurypercus Jeannel, 1948
Eurystomis Chaudoir, 1878
Gastrellarius Casey, 1918
Gourlayia Britton, 1964
Harpostomus Chaudoir, 1856
Henrotiochoromus Busulini, 1958
Henrotius Jeannel, 1953
Holcaspis Chaudoir, 1865
Hybothecus Chaudoir, 1874
Leiolesticus Roux; Lassalle & Dubault, 2016
Lesticus Dejean, 1828
Licentius Jedlicka, 1939
Liopasa Tschitscherine, 1901
Lophoglossus LeConte, 1853
Loxogenius Sloane, 1907
Mecynognathus W.J.MacLeay, 1873
Megadromus Motschulsky, 1866
Molopidius Jeannel, 1942
Molopinus Jeannel, 1948
Molops Bonelli, 1810
Myas Sturm, 1826
Neoferonia Britton, 1940
Nesites Andrewes, 1939
Nirmala Andrewes, 1930
Notabax B.Moore, 1976
Notolestus Sloane, 1894
Notonomus Chaudoir, 1865
Nurus Motschulsky, 1866
Oberthueria Vuillet, 1911
Ogmophora Tschitscherine, 1896
Onawea Johns, 2007
Oscadytes Lagar Mascaro, 1975
Pachymorphus Chaudoir, 1838
Paranurus Tschitscherine, 1901
Pareuryaptus Dubault; Lassalle & Roux, 2008
Parhypates Motschulsky, 1866
Pedius Motschulsky, 1850
Percolaus Bates, 1882
Percus Bonelli, 1810
Peyrieraselus Deuve, 1981
Piesmus LeConte, 1846
Platycoelus Blanchard, 1843
Platysmodes Fauvel, 1903
Plocamostethus Britton, 1940
Poecilinus Jeannel, 1948
Poecilus Bonelli, 1810
Pseudoceneus Tschitscherine, 1891
Pterostichus Bonelli, 1810
Rhabdotus Chaudoir, 1865
Rhytiferonia Darlington, 1962
Rhytisternus Chaudoir, 1865
Sarticus Motschulsky, 1866
Secatophus Laporte, 1867
Setalidius Chaudoir, 1878
Speluncarius Reitter, 1886
Speomolops Patrizi, 1955
Sphodrosomus Perroud, 1864
Stenochoromus L.Miller, 1866
Stereocerus Kirby, 1837
Sthenocranion Tschitscherine, 1899
Stomis Clairville, 1806
Straneostichus Sciaky, 1994
Styracoderus Chaudoir, 1874
Tanythrix Schaum, 1858
Taphoxomimus Straneo, 1975
Tapinopterus Schaum, 1858
Teratotarsa Tschitscherine, 1893
Teropha Laporte, 1867
Trichosternus Chaudoir, 1865
Trigonaptus Fedorenko, 2020
Trigonotoma Dejean, 1828
Troglorites Jeannel, 1919
Tropidocerus Chaudoir, 1878
Typhlochoromus Moczarski, 1913
Wahlbergiana Bousquet, 2002
Xenion Tschitscherine, 1902
Zariquieya Jeannel, 1924
Zeopoecilus Sharp, 1886
