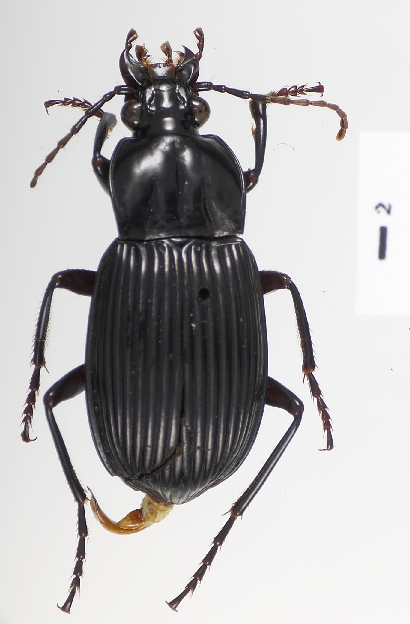
- Microcephalus niger

Scientific classification
- Kingdom: Animalia
- Phylum: Arthropoda
- Class: Insecta
- Order: Coleoptera
- Suborder: Adephaga
- Family: Carabidae
- Subfamily: Pterostichinae
- Tribe: Pterostichini
- Subtribe: Euchroina
- Genus: Microcephalus; Dejean, 1828

= Microcephalus (beetle) =

Genus of beetles

Microcephalus is a genus of in the beetle family Carabidae. There are about 15 described species in Microcephalus, found in South America.

== Species ==
These 15 species belong to the genus Microcephalus:

- Microcephalus affinis Tschitscherine, 1898 (Brazil)
- Microcephalus amplicollis Chaudoir, 1852 (Brazil)
- Microcephalus bolivianus Tschitscherine, 1898 (Bolivia)
- Microcephalus catharinae Tschitscherine, 1898 (Brazil)
- Microcephalus depressicollis Dejean, 1828 (Brazil)
- Microcephalus festivus Tschitscherine, 1898 (Brazil)
- Microcephalus kaszabi (Straneo, 1959) (Brazil)
- Microcephalus magnificus (Lutshnik, 1935) (Brazil)
- Microcephalus minor Chaudoir, 1852 (Brazil)
- Microcephalus niger (Straneo, 1956) (Ecuador)
- Microcephalus orientalis (Straneo, 1951) (Paraguay and Brazil)
- Microcephalus paraguayensis (Straneo, 1951) (Paraguay)
- Microcephalus peruanus (Lutshnik, 1931) (Peru)
- Microcephalus subsinuatus (Straneo, 1956) (Peru)
- Microcephalus superbus Tschitscherine, 1898 (Brazil)
