= Molopinus =

Scientific classification
- Domain: Eukaryota
- Kingdom: Animalia
- Phylum: Arthropoda
- Class: Insecta
- Order: Coleoptera
- Suborder: Adephaga
- Family: Carabidae
- Tribe: Pterostichini
- Subtribe: Pterostichina
- Genus: Molopinus; Jeannel, 1948
- Species: M. pilipes

Binomial name
- Molopinus pilipes (Tschitscherine, 1899)

Genus of beetles

Molopinus is a genus in the ground beetle family Carabidae. This genus has a single species, Molopinus pilipes. It is found in Madagascar.
