= Haptoderidius =

Scientific classification
- Kingdom: Animalia
- Phylum: Arthropoda
- Class: Insecta
- Order: Coleoptera
- Suborder: Adephaga
- Family: Carabidae
- Tribe: Pterostichini
- Subtribe: Abacetina
- Genus: Haptoderidius; Straneo, 1975
- Species: H. debeckeri

Binomial name
- Haptoderidius debeckeri (Straneo, 1975)

Genus of beetles

Haptoderidius is a genus of carabids in the beetle family Carabidae. This genus has a single species, Haptoderidius debeckeri. It is found in Tanzania.
