= Prostalomus =

Scientific classification
- Domain: Eukaryota
- Kingdom: Animalia
- Phylum: Arthropoda
- Class: Insecta
- Order: Coleoptera
- Suborder: Adephaga
- Family: Carabidae
- Tribe: Pterostichini
- Subtribe: Abacetina
- Genus: Prostalomus; Basilewsky, 1950
- Species: P. parcepunctatus

Binomial name
- Prostalomus parcepunctatus (Jeannel, 1948)

Genus of beetles

Prostalomus is a genus in the ground beetle family Carabidae. This genus has a single species, Prostalomus parcepunctatus. It is found in Madagascar.
