= Molopidius =

Scientific classification
- Kingdom: Animalia
- Phylum: Arthropoda
- Clade: Pancrustacea
- Class: Insecta
- Order: Coleoptera
- Suborder: Adephaga
- Family: Carabidae
- Tribe: Pterostichini
- Subtribe: Pterostichina
- Genus: Molopidius; Jeannel, 1942
- Species: M. spinicollis

Binomial name
- Molopidius spinicollis (Dejean, 1828)

Genus of beetles

Molopidius is a genus in the ground beetle family Carabidae. This genus has a single species, Molopidius spinicollis. It is found in France and Spain.
