= Catadromus =

Scientific classification
- Domain: Eukaryota
- Kingdom: Animalia
- Phylum: Arthropoda
- Class: Insecta
- Order: Coleoptera
- Suborder: Adephaga
- Family: Carabidae
- Subfamily: Pterostichinae
- Tribe: Pterostichini
- Subtribe: Pterostichina
- Genus: Catadromus; W.S.MacLeay, 1825

Genus of beetles

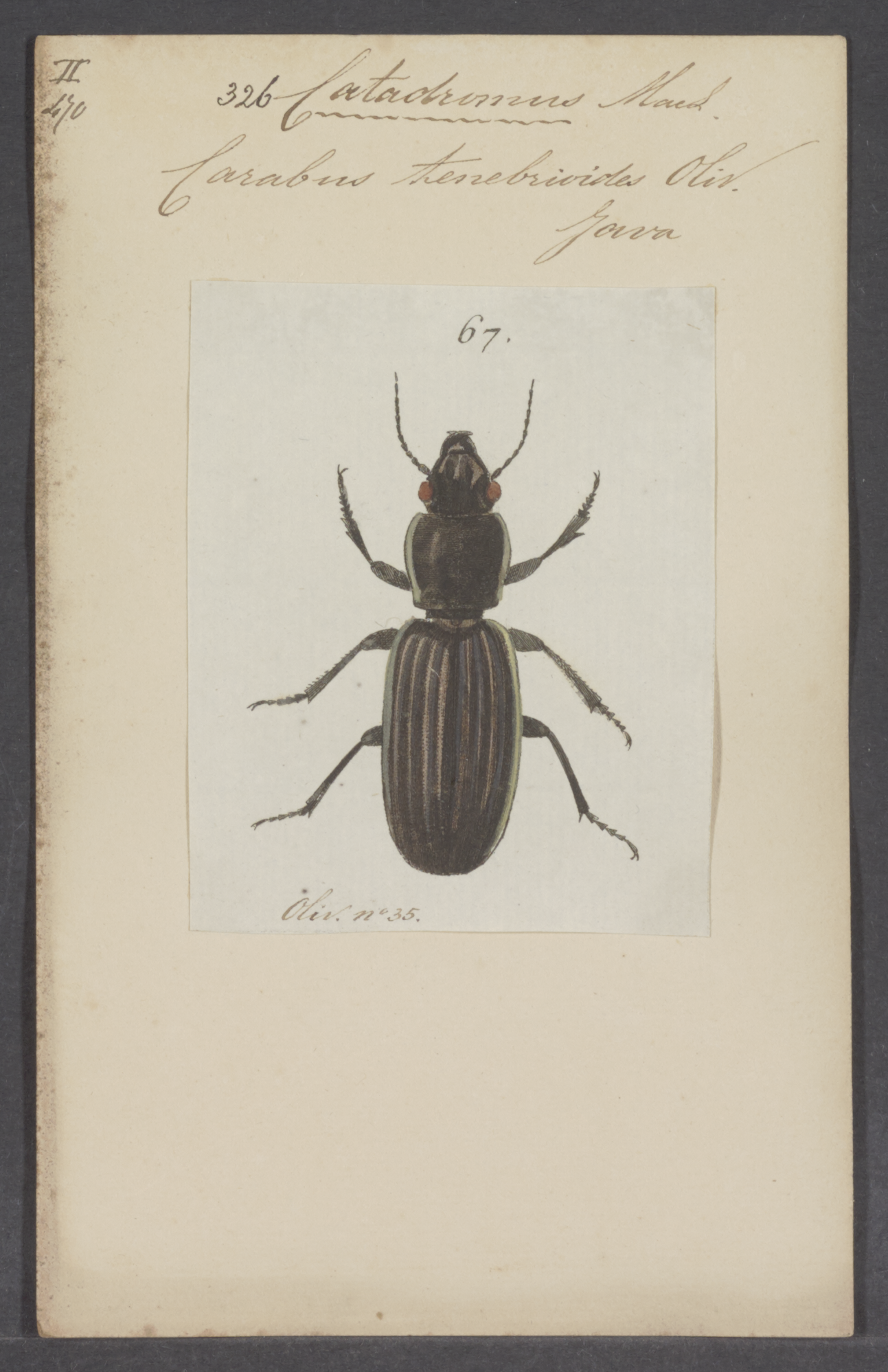
Catadromus

Catadromus is a genus in the beetle family Carabidae. There are about eight described species in Catadromus.

== Species ==
These eight species belong to the genus Catadromus:

- Catadromus australis Laporte, 1834 (Australia)
- Catadromus cooki Giachino, 2005
- Catadromus goliath Tschitscherine, 1896 (Australia)
- Catadromus lacordairei Boisduval, 1835 (Australia)
- Catadromus malayanus Tschitscherine, 1896 (Singapore)
- Catadromus rajah (Wiedemann, 1824) (Indonesia, New Guinea, and Australia)
- Catadromus simonae Dupuis, 1911 (Australia)
- Catadromus tschitscherini Straneo, 1941 (Australia)
