= Novillidius =

Scientific classification
- Kingdom: Animalia
- Phylum: Arthropoda
- Class: Insecta
- Order: Coleoptera
- Suborder: Adephaga
- Family: Carabidae
- Subfamily: Pterostichinae
- Tribe: Pterostichini
- Subtribe: Abacetina
- Genus: Novillidius; Straneo, 1941

Genus of beetles

Novillidius is a genus in the ground beetle family Carabidae. There are at least three described species in Novillidius, found in Africa.

== Species ==
These three species belong to the genus Novillidius:

- Novillidius marginellus Straneo, 1943 (Guinea-Bissau, Cameroon)
- Novillidius muelleri Straneo, 1941 (Ethiopia)
- Novillidius rectibasis Straneo, 1979 (Kenya)
