= Ogmophora =

Scientific classification
- Domain: Eukaryota
- Kingdom: Animalia
- Phylum: Arthropoda
- Class: Insecta
- Order: Coleoptera
- Suborder: Adephaga
- Family: Carabidae
- Tribe: Pterostichini
- Subtribe: Pterostichina
- Genus: Ogmophora; Tschitscherine, 1896
- Species: O. peringueyi

Binomial name
- Ogmophora peringueyi (Tschitscherine, 1896)

Genus of beetles

Ogmophora is a genus in the ground beetle family Carabidae. This genus has a single species, Ogmophora peringueyi. It is found in South Africa.
