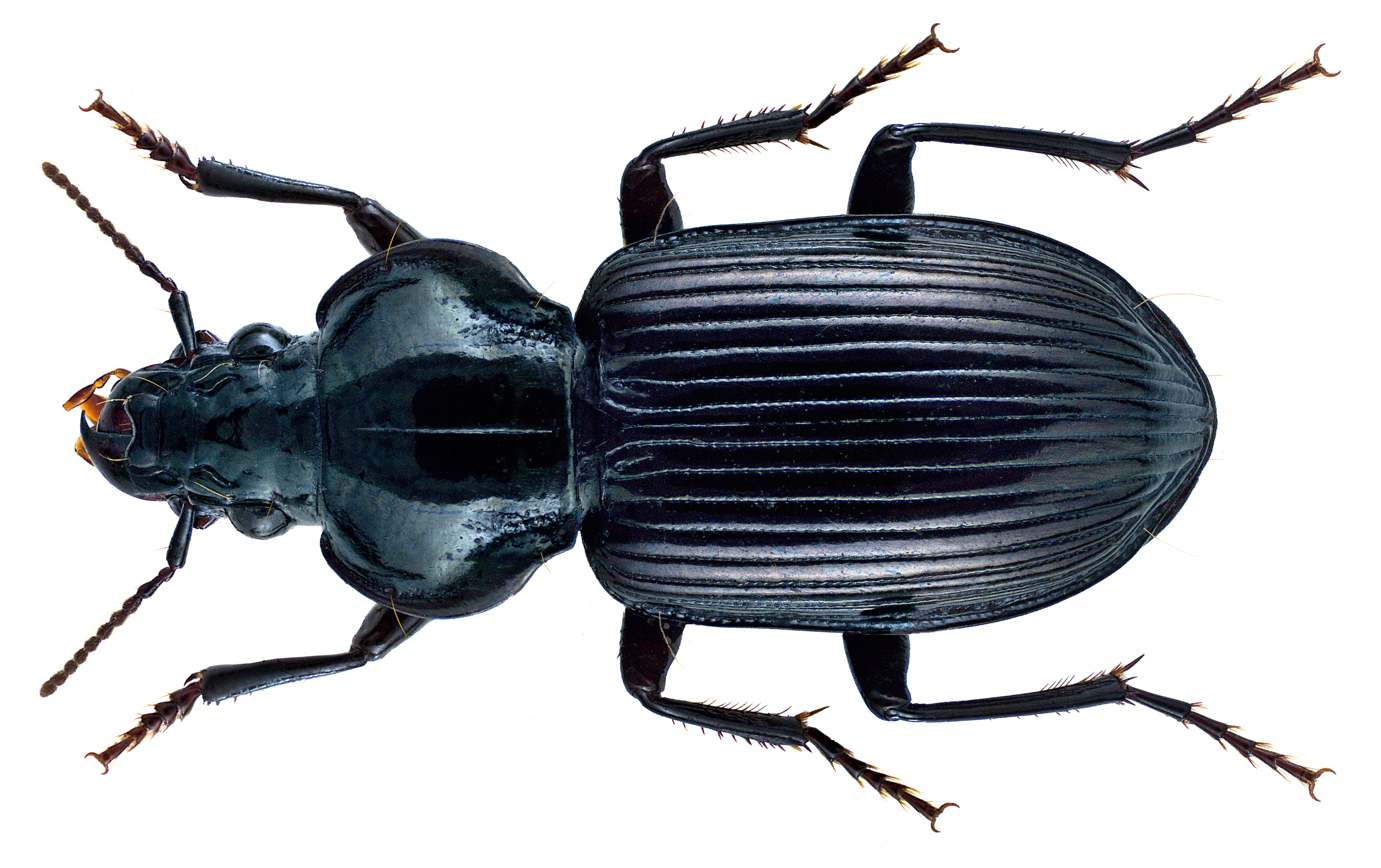
- Pareuryaptus glastenvalum

Scientific classification
- Domain: Eukaryota
- Kingdom: Animalia
- Phylum: Arthropoda
- Class: Insecta
- Order: Coleoptera
- Suborder: Adephaga
- Family: Carabidae
- Subfamily: Pterostichinae
- Tribe: Pterostichini
- Subtribe: Pterostichina
- Genus: Pareuryaptus; Dubault; Lassalle & Roux, 2008

= Pareuryaptus =

Genus of beetles

Pareuryaptus is a genus in the beetle family Carabidae. There are about 19 described species in Pareuryaptus, found mainly in Southeast Asia.

== Species ==
These 19 species belong to the genus Pareuryaptus:

- Pareuryaptus adoxus (Tschitscherine, 1900) (Vietnam)
- Pareuryaptus aethiops (Tschitscherine, 1897) (Myanmar and Thailand)
- Pareuryaptus cambodgiensis Dubault; Lassalle & Roux, 2008 (Cambodia)
- Pareuryaptus chalceolus (Bates, 1873) (China, Taiwan, and Vietnam)
- Pareuryaptus chalcodes (Andrewes, 1923) (Laos and Vietnam)
- Pareuryaptus curtulus (Chaudoir, 1868) (Laos)
- Pareuryaptus cyanellus (Tschitscherine, 1900) (Vietnam)
- Pareuryaptus exiguus Dubault; Lassalle & Roux, 2008 (Vietnam)
- Pareuryaptus gilletti Dubault; Lassalle & Roux, 2008 (Laos)
- Pareuryaptus glastenvalum (Morvan, 1992) (Thailand)
- Pareuryaptus hovorkai Lassalle & Roux, 2018 (Thailand)
- Pareuryaptus laolumorum Dubault; Lassalle & Roux, 2008 (Laos)
- Pareuryaptus laosensis (Kirschenhofer, 2007) (Laos)
- Pareuryaptus loeffleri (Kirschenhofer, 2007) (Thailand)
- Pareuryaptus luangphabangensis Kirschenhofer, 2011 (Laos)
- Pareuryaptus lucidus (Andrewes, 1930) (Indonesia)
- Pareuryaptus morosus (Tschitscherine, 1900) (Cambodia)
- Pareuryaptus namptap Kirschenhofer, 2011 (Laos)
- Pareuryaptus parvus Dubault; Lassalle & Roux, 2008 (Vietnam)
