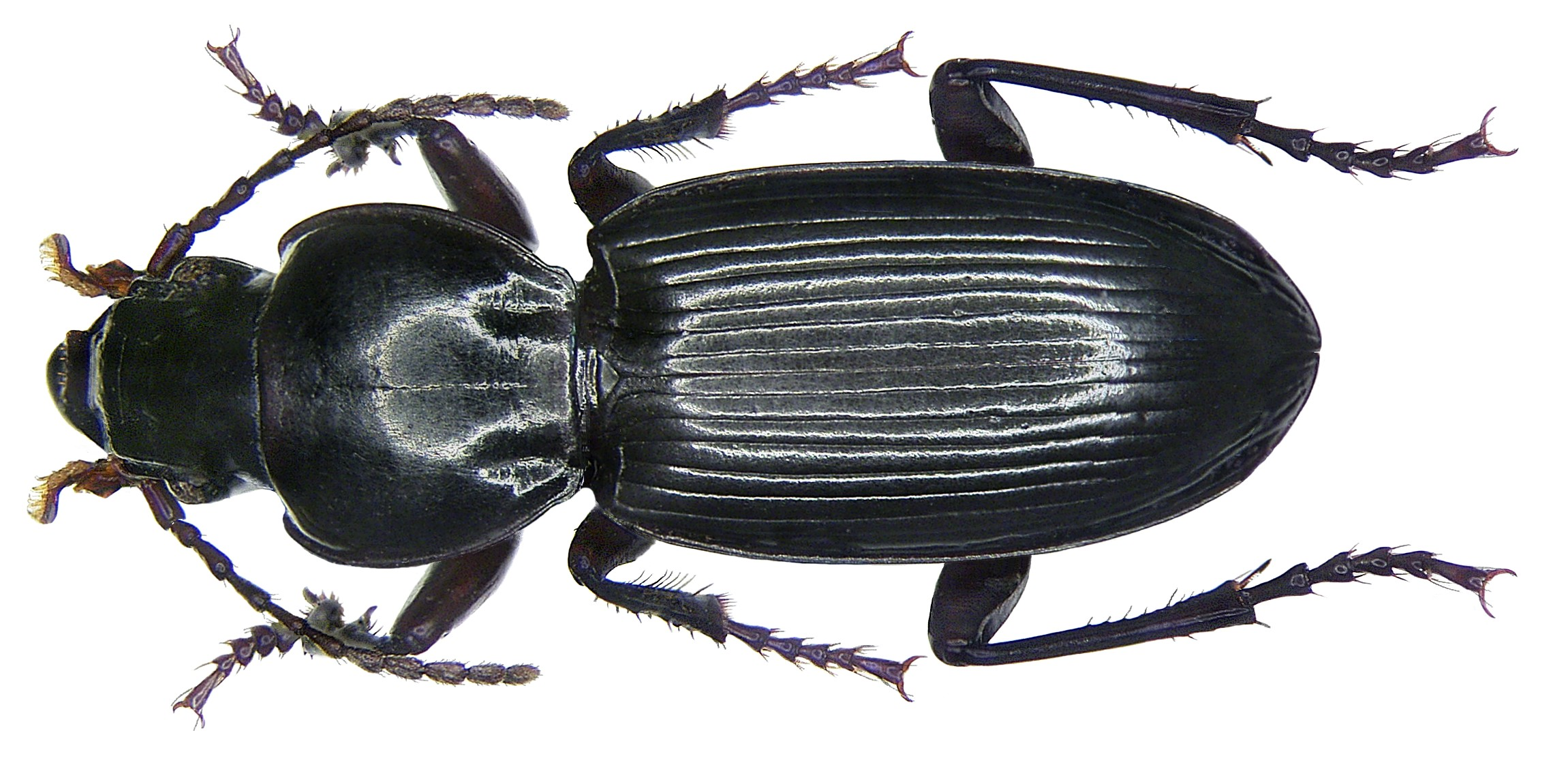
- Tapinopterus kapparicola

Scientific classification
- Domain: Eukaryota
- Kingdom: Animalia
- Phylum: Arthropoda
- Class: Insecta
- Order: Coleoptera
- Suborder: Adephaga
- Family: Carabidae
- Subfamily: Pterostichinae
- Tribe: Pterostichini
- Subtribe: Pterostichina
- Genus: Tapinopterus; Schaum, 1858

Subgenera
- Crisimus Habelmann, 1885; Hoplauchenium Tschitscherine, 1900; Hoplodactylella E.Strand, 1936; Molopsis Schatzmayr, 1943; Percosteropus Ganglbauer, 1897; Pseudomolopsis Giachino; Picciau; Vailati & Casale, 2012; Pterotapinus Heyden, 1883; Tapinopercus Maran, 1932; Tapinopterus Schaum, 1858

= Tapinopterus =

Genus of beetles

Tapinopterus is a genus of in the beetle family Carabidae. There are more than 70 described species in Tapinopterus, found in Europe and southwest Asia.

== Species ==
These 75 species belong to the genus Tapinopterus:

- Tapinopterus aenigmaticus Lohaj et al., 2012
- Tapinopterus aetolicus Ganglbauer, 1889
- Tapinopterus agonaderus (Chaudoir, 1850)
- Tapinopterus amani (Breit, 1933)
- Tapinopterus arcadicus G.Müller, 1946
- Tapinopterus attemsi (Apfelbeck, 1904)
- Tapinopterus atticus (Apfelbeck, 1904)
- Tapinopterus balcanicus Ganglbauer, 1891
- Tapinopterus bartonii Maran, 1933
- Tapinopterus bischoffi G.Müller, 1936
- Tapinopterus chaudoiri Lohaj et al., 2012
- Tapinopterus cognatus (Dejean, 1831)
- Tapinopterus comita Jedlicka, 1935
- Tapinopterus continentalis (Breit, 1923)
- Tapinopterus creticus (I.Frivaldszky von Frivald, 1845)
- Tapinopterus detonii Schatzmayr, 1943
- Tapinopterus diadochos (Lutshnik, 1915)
- Tapinopterus dochii (Apfelbeck, 1906)
- Tapinopterus duponchelii (Dejean, 1831)
- Tapinopterus extensus (Dejean, 1831)
- Tapinopterus fairmairei (Chaudoir, 1868)
- Tapinopterus filigranus (L.Miller, 1862)
- Tapinopterus ganglbaueri (Tschitscherine, 1897)
- Tapinopterus ganglbauerianus (Lutshnik, 1915)
- Tapinopterus heinzi Straneo, 1983
- Tapinopterus heyrovskyi Jedlicka, 1939
- Tapinopterus imperialis Reitter, 1886
- Tapinopterus insulicola (Tschitscherine, 1900)
- Tapinopterus jaechi Kirschenhofer, 1991
- Tapinopterus jedlickai (Maran, 1932)
- Tapinopterus kalavrytanus Maran, 1939
- Tapinopterus kapparicola Ganglbauer, 1889
- Tapinopterus kerberos Kirschenhofer, 1997
- Tapinopterus kuntzeni G.Müller, 1931
- Tapinopterus kyparissis (Jedlicka, 1963)
- Tapinopterus laevisternus G.Müller, 1931
- Tapinopterus laticornis (Fairmaire, 1856)
- Tapinopterus lohaji Donabauer, 2012
- Tapinopterus macedonicus Curcic et al., 2008
- Tapinopterus machardi (Jeanne, 2005)
- Tapinopterus marani V. & B.Gueorguiev, 1999
- Tapinopterus meschniggi (Schatzmayr, 1928)
- Tapinopterus microgonus Machard, 2018
- Tapinopterus minax (Tschitscherine, 1900)
- Tapinopterus miridita (Apfelbeck, 1904)
- Tapinopterus molopiformis (Lutshnik, 1922)
- Tapinopterus molopinus (Chaudoir, 1868)
- Tapinopterus monastirensis Reitter, 1913
- Tapinopterus moreoticus Maran, 1937
- Tapinopterus obenbergeri (Maran, 1932)
- Tapinopterus oetensis Maran, 1940
- Tapinopterus oyukluensis Lohaj et al., 2012
- Tapinopterus paganettii (Breit, 1923)
- Tapinopterus pelionensis (Breit, 1923)
- Tapinopterus peristericus Apfelbeck, 1901
- Tapinopterus persicus (Chaudoir, 1878)
- Tapinopterus phrygius G.Müller, 1931
- Tapinopterus pindicus Maran, 1939
- Tapinopterus placidus (Rosenhauer, 1847)
- Tapinopterus protensus (Schaum, 1857)
- Tapinopterus punctatostriatus Heyden, 1883
- Tapinopterus punctatus (L.Redtenbacher, 1843)
- Tapinopterus purkynei Jedlicka, 1928
- Tapinopterus rambousekianus Maran, 1933
- Tapinopterus rebellis (Reiche & Saulcy, 1855)
- Tapinopterus relegatus Lohaj et al., 2012
- Tapinopterus samai Straneo, 1986
- Tapinopterus stepaneki Maran, 1934
- Tapinopterus susterai (Maran, 1943)
- Tapinopterus taborskyi Maran, 1939
- Tapinopterus thessalicus Reitter, 1886
- Tapinopterus toelgi (Breit, 1933)
- Tapinopterus weiratheri G.Müller, 1931
- Tapinopterus wiedemanni (Chaudoir, 1850)
- Tapinopterus zygosensis Maran, 1939
