= Trachelocyphus =

Scientific classification
- Domain: Eukaryota
- Kingdom: Animalia
- Phylum: Arthropoda
- Class: Insecta
- Order: Coleoptera
- Suborder: Adephaga
- Family: Carabidae
- Subfamily: Pterostichinae
- Tribe: Pterostichini
- Subtribe: Abacetina
- Genus: Trachelocyphus; Tschitscherine, 1900

Genus of beetles

Trachelocyphus is a genus of in the beetle family Carabidae.

== Species ==
These five species belong to the genus Trachelocyphus:

- Trachelocyphus aenigmaticus Tschitscherine, 1900 (Africa)
- Trachelocyphus gerardianus (Burgeon, 1935) (Democratic Republic of the Congo)
- Trachelocyphus mirulus (Tschitscherine, 1901) (Ivory Coast)
- Trachelocyphus trisulcis (Chaudoir, 1878) (Tanzania)
- Trachelocyphus tschitscherini Lutshnik, 1922 (Ivory Coast)
