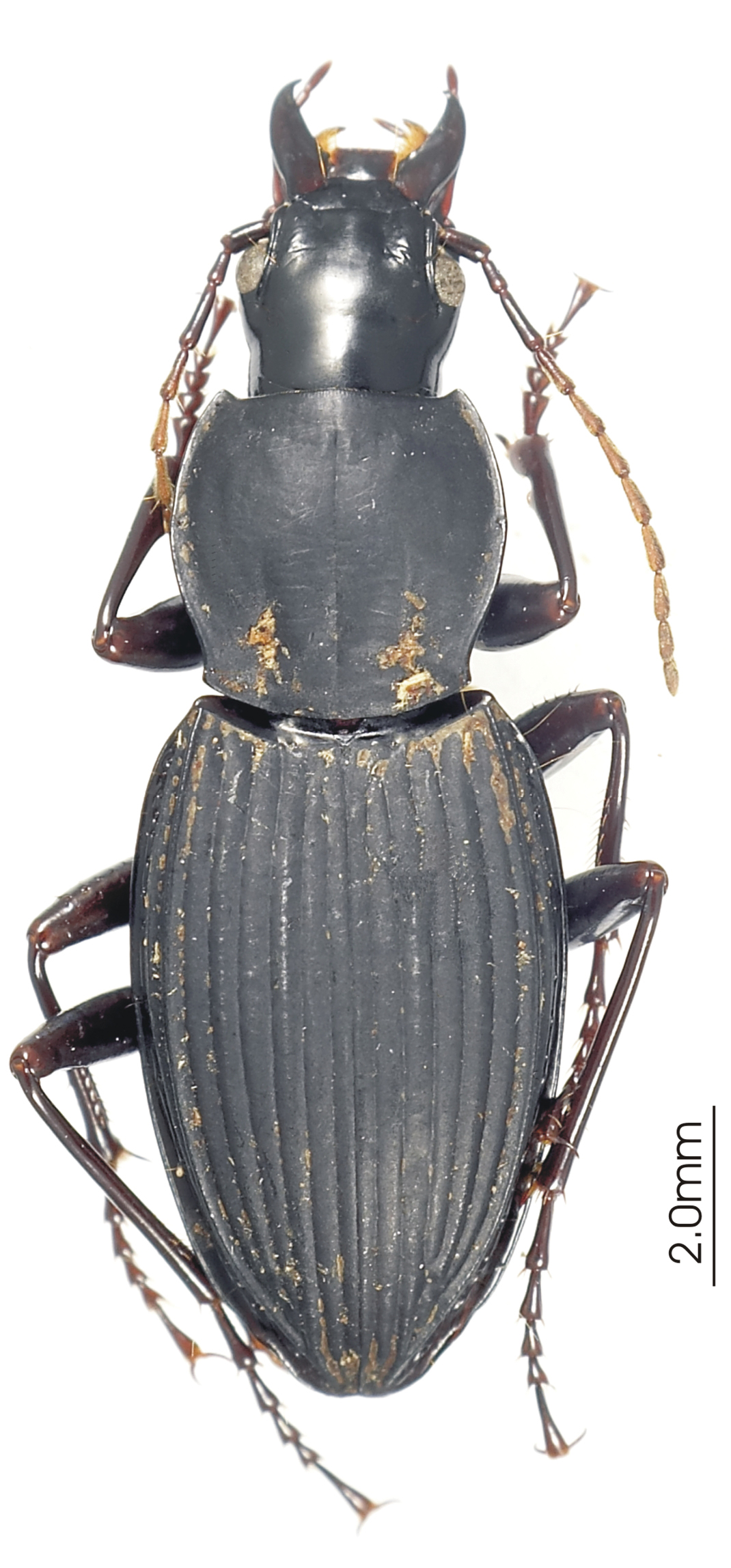

Scientific classification
- Domain: Eukaryota
- Kingdom: Animalia
- Phylum: Arthropoda
- Class: Insecta
- Order: Coleoptera
- Suborder: Adephaga
- Family: Carabidae
- Subfamily: Pterostichinae
- Tribe: Pterostichini
- Subtribe: Pterostichina
- Genus: Platysmodes; Fauvel, 1903
- Species: P. gambeyi

Binomial name
- Platysmodes gambeyi (Fauvel, 1882)

= Platysmodes =

Genus of beetles

Platysmodes is a genus in the ground beetle family Carabidae. This genus has a single species, Platysmodes gambeyi. It is found in New Caledonia.
