= Sthenocranion =

Scientific classification
- Domain: Eukaryota
- Kingdom: Animalia
- Phylum: Arthropoda
- Class: Insecta
- Order: Coleoptera
- Suborder: Adephaga
- Family: Carabidae
- Tribe: Pterostichini
- Subtribe: Pterostichina
- Genus: Sthenocranion; Tschitscherine, 1899
- Species: S. severini

Binomial name
- Sthenocranion severini (Tschitscherine, 1896)

Genus of beetles

Sthenocranion is a genus in the ground beetle family Carabidae. This genus has a single species, Sthenocranion severini. It is found in South Africa.
