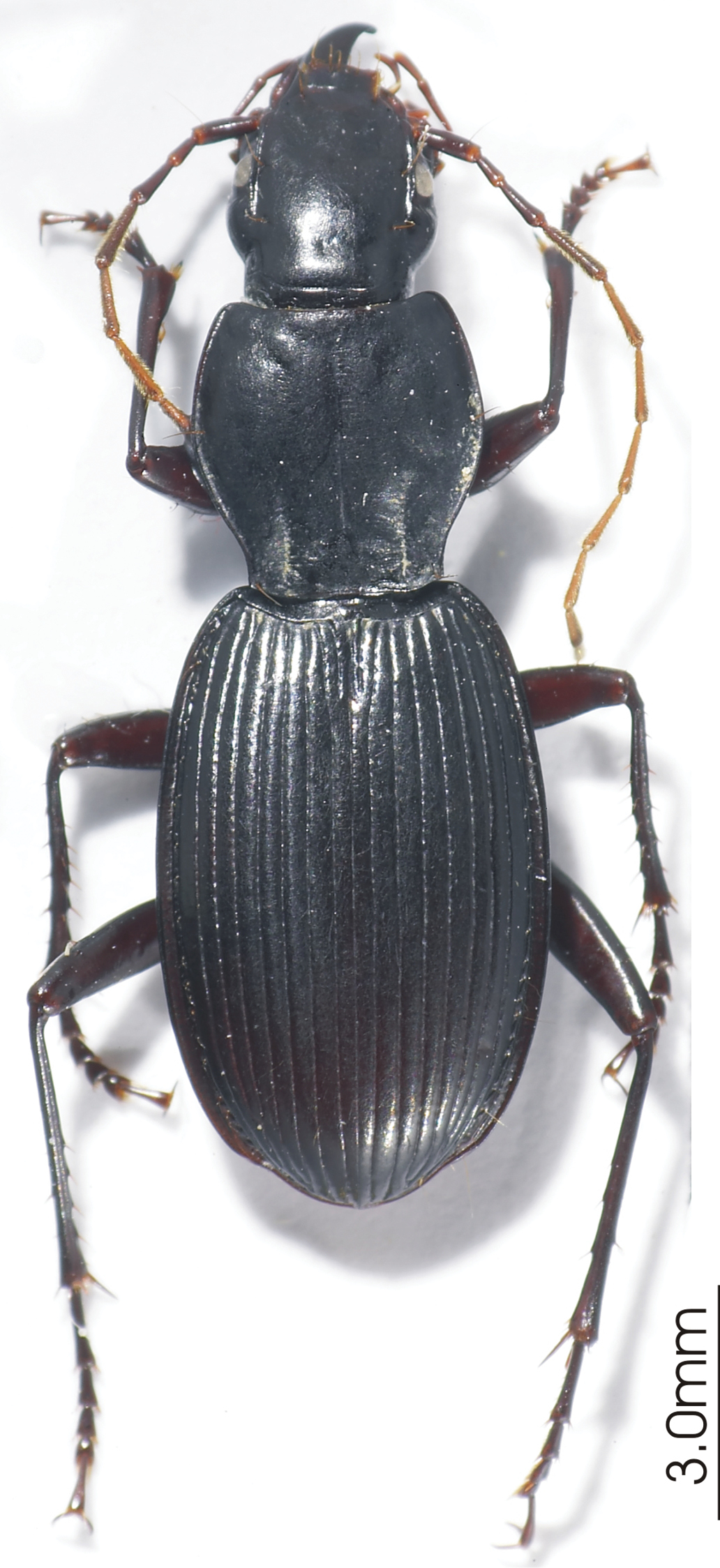

Scientific classification
- Domain: Eukaryota
- Kingdom: Animalia
- Phylum: Arthropoda
- Class: Insecta
- Order: Coleoptera
- Suborder: Adephaga
- Family: Carabidae
- Subfamily: Pterostichinae
- Tribe: Pterostichini
- Subtribe: Euchroina
- Genus: Paniestichus; Will, 2011
- Species: P. subsolianus

Binomial name
- Paniestichus subsolianus Will, 2011

= Paniestichus =

Genus of beetles

Paniestichus is a genus in the ground beetle family Carabidae. This genus has a single species, Paniestichus subsolianus. It is found in New Caledonia.
