= Mecynognathus =

Scientific classification
- Domain: Eukaryota
- Kingdom: Animalia
- Phylum: Arthropoda
- Class: Insecta
- Order: Coleoptera
- Suborder: Adephaga
- Family: Carabidae
- Tribe: Pterostichini
- Subtribe: Pterostichina
- Genus: Mecynognathus; W.J.MacLeay, 1873
- Species: M. damelii

Binomial name
- Mecynognathus damelii W.J.MacLeay, 1873

Genus of beetles

Mecynognathus is a genus in the ground beetle family Carabidae. This genus has a single species, Mecynognathus damelii. It is found in Australia.
