= Distrigidius =

Scientific classification
- Domain: Eukaryota
- Kingdom: Animalia
- Phylum: Arthropoda
- Class: Insecta
- Order: Coleoptera
- Suborder: Adephaga
- Family: Carabidae
- Subfamily: Pterostichinae
- Tribe: Pterostichini
- Subtribe: Abacetina
- Genus: Distrigidius; Jeannel, 1948
- Species: D. apicalis

Binomial name
- Distrigidius apicalis Jeannel, 1948

Genus of beetles

Distrigidius is a genus in the ground beetle family Carabidae. This genus has a single species, Distrigidius apicalis. It is found in Madagascar.
