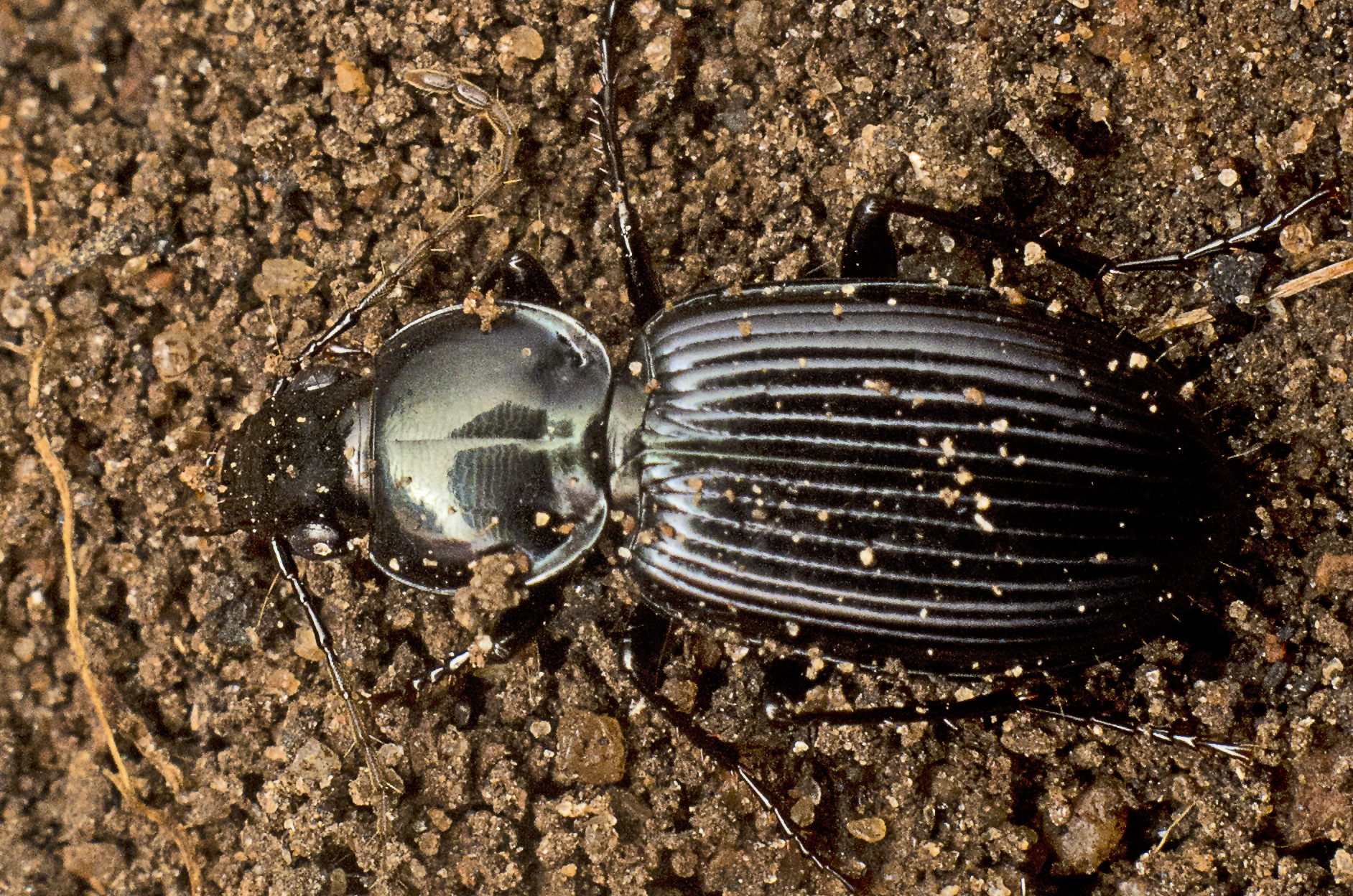
- Sarticus, Australia

Scientific classification
- Kingdom: Animalia
- Phylum: Arthropoda
- Class: Insecta
- Order: Coleoptera
- Suborder: Adephaga
- Family: Carabidae
- Subfamily: Pterostichinae
- Tribe: Pterostichini
- Subtribe: Pterostichina
- Genus: Sarticus; Motschulsky, 1866

Subgenera
- Coronacanthus W.J.MacLeay, 1878; Sarticus Motschulsky, 1866

= Sarticus =

Genus of beetles

Sarticus is a genus in the beetle family Carabidae. There are more than 20 described species in Sarticus, found in Australia.

== Species ==
These 22 species belong to the genus Sarticus:

- Sarticus aubei (Laporte, 1867)
- Sarticus brevicornis Blackburn, 1892
- Sarticus civilis (Germar, 1848)
- Sarticus cooki Sloane, 1903
- Sarticus coradgeri Sloane, 1903
- Sarticus cyaneocinctus (Chaudoir, 1865)
- Sarticus cycloderus (Chaudoir, 1865)
- Sarticus dampieri Sloane, 1903
- Sarticus discopunctatus (Chaudoir, 1865)
- Sarticus dixoni Sloane, 1915
- Sarticus esmeraldipennis (Laporte, 1867)
- Sarticus freyi Straneo, 1960
- Sarticus habitans Sloane, 1889
- Sarticus iriditinctus (Chaudoir, 1865)
- Sarticus ischnus (Chaudoir, 1878)
- Sarticus macleayi Sloane, 1889
- Sarticus monarensis Sloane, 1889
- Sarticus obesulus (Chaudoir, 1865)
- Sarticus obscurus Blackburn, 1892
- Sarticus obsolescens B.Moore, 1963
- Sarticus rockhamptoniensis (Laporte, 1867)
- Sarticus sulcatus (W.J.MacLeay, 1878)
