= Euryaptus =

Scientific classification
- Domain: Eukaryota
- Kingdom: Animalia
- Phylum: Arthropoda
- Class: Insecta
- Order: Coleoptera
- Suborder: Adephaga
- Family: Carabidae
- Subfamily: Pterostichinae
- Tribe: Pterostichini
- Subtribe: Pterostichina
- Genus: Euryaptus; Bates, 1892

Genus of beetles

Euryaptus is a genus in the ground beetle family Carabidae. There are about six described species in Euryaptus, known from India, Myanmar, and Thailand.

== Species ==
These six species belong to the genus Euryaptus:

- Euryaptus assamensis Bates, 1892 (India)
- Euryaptus basirugatus Dubault; Lassalle & Roux, 2008 (India)
- Euryaptus kankompezanus Morvan, 1992 (Thailand)
- Euryaptus kirschenhoferi Straneo, 1984 (India)
- Euryaptus nigellus Bates, 1892 (India and Myanmar)
- Euryaptus rufipes Bates, 1892 (India)
