= Nurus =

Scientific classification
- Kingdom: Animalia
- Phylum: Arthropoda
- Class: Insecta
- Order: Coleoptera
- Suborder: Adephaga
- Family: Carabidae
- Subfamily: Pterostichinae
- Tribe: Pterostichini
- Subtribe: Pterostichina
- Genus: Nurus; Motschulsky, 1866

Genus of beetles

Nurus is a genus in the beetle family Carabidae. There are about 15 described species in Nurus, found in Australia.

== Species ==
These 15 species belong to the genus Nurus:

- Nurus atlas (Laporte, 1867)
- Nurus baehri Will & Monteith, 2018
- Nurus brevis Motschulsky, 1866
- Nurus curtus (Chaudoir, 1865)
- Nurus fortis (Sloane, 1890)
- Nurus grandis (Sloane, 1910)
- Nurus imperialis (Sloane, 1895)
- Nurus latipennis (Sloane, 1903)
- Nurus medius Darlington, 1961
- Nurus moorei Will & Monteith, 2018
- Nurus niger Chaudoir, 1878
- Nurus nox Darlington, 1961
- Nurus perater (Sloane, 1923)
- Nurus popplei Will & Monteith, 2018
- Nurus rex Darlington, 1961
