= Peyrieraselus =

Scientific classification
- Domain: Eukaryota
- Kingdom: Animalia
- Phylum: Arthropoda
- Class: Insecta
- Order: Coleoptera
- Suborder: Adephaga
- Family: Carabidae
- Tribe: Pterostichini
- Subtribe: Pterostichina
- Genus: Peyrieraselus; Deuve, 1981
- Species: P. relictus

Binomial name
- Peyrieraselus relictus Deuve, 1981

Genus of beetles

Peyrieraselus is a genus in the ground beetle family Carabidae. This genus has a single species, Peyrieraselus relictus. It is found in Madagascar.
