= Eumara =

Scientific classification
- Domain: Eukaryota
- Kingdom: Animalia
- Phylum: Arthropoda
- Class: Insecta
- Order: Coleoptera
- Suborder: Adephaga
- Family: Carabidae
- Subfamily: Pterostichinae
- Tribe: Pterostichini
- Subtribe: Euchroina
- Genus: Eumara; Tschitscherine, 1901

Genus of beetles

Eumara is a genus in the ground beetle family Carabidae. There are at least four described species in Eumara, found in South America.

== Species ==
These four species belong to the genus Eumara:

- Eumara hiekei Straneo, 1990 (Paraguay)
- Eumara maindroni Tschitscherine, 1901 (Brazil)
- Eumara negrei Straneo, 1967 (Argentina)
- Eumara obscura (Putzeys, 1875) (Uruguay, Brazil)
