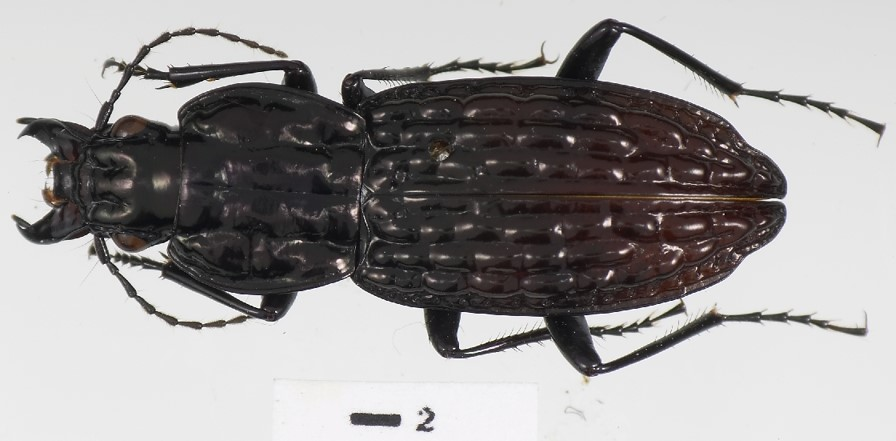
- Oribazus catenulatus

Scientific classification
- Domain: Eukaryota
- Kingdom: Animalia
- Phylum: Arthropoda
- Class: Insecta
- Order: Coleoptera
- Suborder: Adephaga
- Family: Carabidae
- Subfamily: Pterostichinae
- Tribe: Pterostichini
- Subtribe: Euchroina
- Genus: Oribazus; Chaudoir, 1874

Synonyms
- Oribas C.A.Dohrn, 1875; Oribasus C.A.Dohrn, 1875

= Oribazus =

Genus of beetles

Oribazus is a genus in the ground beetle family Carabidae. There are at least two described species in Oribazus, found in Colombia and Venezuela.

== Species ==
These two species belong to the genus Oribazus:

- Oribazus catenulatus Chaudoir, 1874 (Colombia and Venezuela)
- Oribazus quinquestriatus Chaudoir, 1874 (Colombia)
