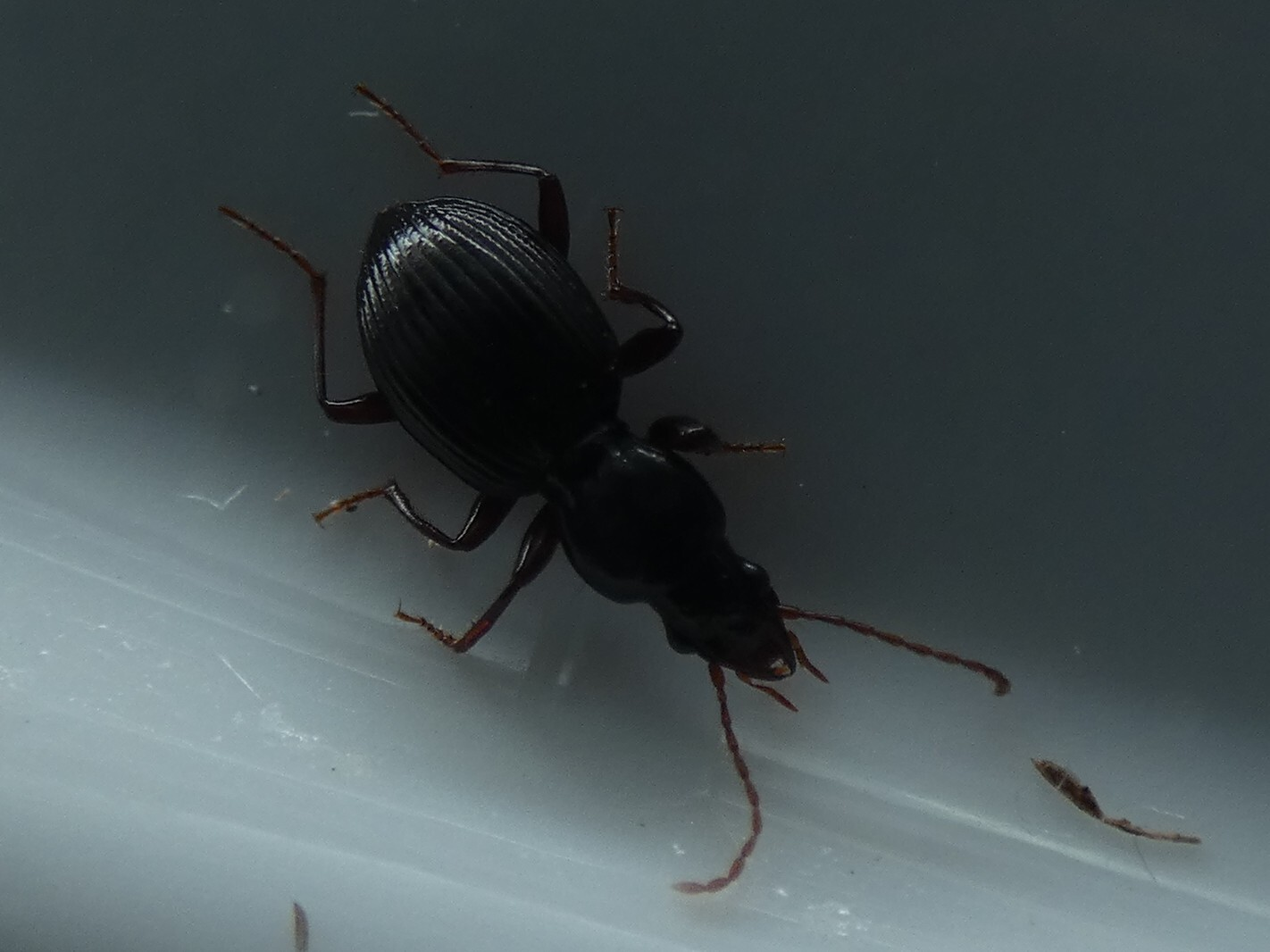

Scientific classification
- Kingdom: Animalia
- Phylum: Arthropoda
- Class: Insecta
- Order: Coleoptera
- Suborder: Adephaga
- Family: Carabidae
- Subfamily: Pterostichinae
- Tribe: Pterostichini
- Subtribe: Pterostichina
- Genus: Basilewskya; Straneo, 1948

= Basilewskya =

Genus of beetles

Basilewskya is a genus of in the beetle family Carabidae. There are at least three described species in Basilewskya.

== Species ==
These three species belong to the genus Basilewskya:

- Basilewskya geginati Schüle, 2004 (South Africa)
- Basilewskya punctata Straneo, 1958 (South Africa)
- Basilewskya trachelocyphoides Straneo, 1948 (South Africa)
