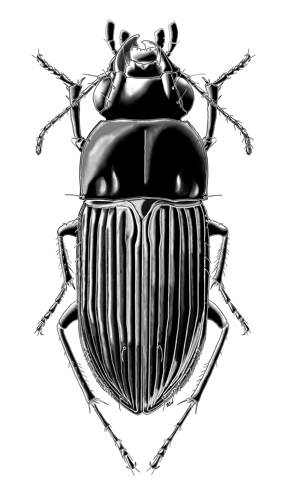

Scientific classification
- Domain: Eukaryota
- Kingdom: Animalia
- Phylum: Arthropoda
- Class: Insecta
- Order: Coleoptera
- Suborder: Adephaga
- Family: Carabidae
- Subfamily: Pterostichinae
- Tribe: Pterostichini
- Subtribe: Euchroina
- Genus: Neotalus; Will, 2002
- Species: N. portai

Binomial name
- Neotalus portai (Straneo, 1941)

= Neotalus =

Genus of beetles

Neotalus is a genus in the ground beetle family Carabidae. This genus has a single species, Neotalus portai. It is found in Bolivia, Paraguay, and Brazil.
