= Cephalostichus =

Scientific classification
- Kingdom: Animalia
- Phylum: Arthropoda
- Class: Insecta
- Order: Coleoptera
- Suborder: Adephaga
- Family: Carabidae
- Subfamily: Pterostichinae
- Tribe: Pterostichini
- Subtribe: Euchroina
- Genus: Cephalostichus; Straneo, 1977

Genus of beetles

Cephalostichus is a genus in the ground beetle family Carabidae. There are at least two described species in Cephalostichus, found in South America.

== Species ==
These two species belong to the genus Cephalostichus:

- Cephalostichus laticeps (Straneo, 1953) (Brazil)
- Cephalostichus putzeysi (Chaudoir, 1876) (Chile)
