= Pachythecus =

Scientific classification
- Domain: Eukaryota
- Kingdom: Animalia
- Phylum: Arthropoda
- Class: Insecta
- Order: Coleoptera
- Suborder: Adephaga
- Family: Carabidae
- Tribe: Pterostichini
- Subtribe: Euchroina
- Genus: Pachythecus; Chaudoir, 1874
- Species: P. rubrocupreus

Binomial name
- Pachythecus rubrocupreus Chaudoir, 1874

Genus of beetles

Pachythecus is a genus in the ground beetle family Carabidae. This genus has a single species, Pachythecus rubrocupreus. It is found in Brazil.
