= Rhagadillius =

Scientific classification
- Kingdom: Animalia
- Phylum: Arthropoda
- Class: Insecta
- Order: Coleoptera
- Suborder: Adephaga
- Family: Carabidae
- Tribe: Pterostichini
- Subtribe: Abacetina
- Genus: Rhagadillius; Straneo, 1951
- Species: R. aethiopicus

Binomial name
- Rhagadillius aethiopicus Straneo, 1951

Genus of beetles

Rhagadillius is a genus in the ground beetle family Carabidae. This genus has a single species, Rhagadillius aethiopicus. It is found in Ethiopia.
