= Oodinkosa =

Scientific classification
- Kingdom: Animalia
- Phylum: Arthropoda
- Class: Insecta
- Order: Coleoptera
- Suborder: Adephaga
- Family: Carabidae
- Subfamily: Pterostichinae
- Tribe: Pterostichini
- Subtribe: Abacetina
- Genus: Oodinkosa; Straneo, 1939

Genus of beetles

Oodinkosa is a genus in the ground beetle family Carabidae. There are at least three described species in Oodinkosa.

== Species ==
These three species belong to the genus Oodinkosa:

- Oodinkosa crassula Straneo, 1939 (Congo and Uganda)
- Oodinkosa massarti (Burgeon, 1935) (DR Congo)
- Oodinkosa punctulata Straneo, 1951 (Congo, DR Congo)
