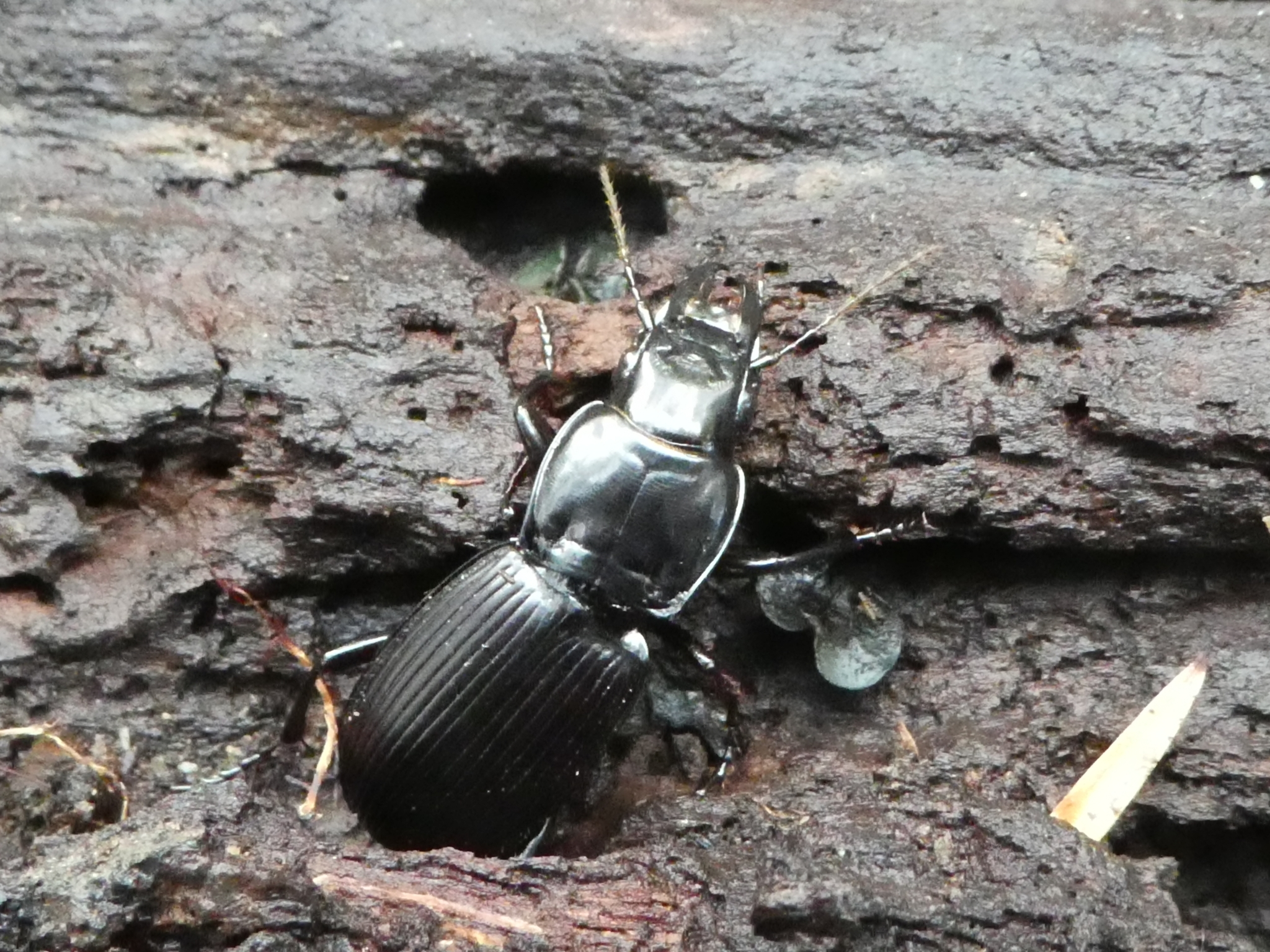

Scientific classification
- Domain: Eukaryota
- Kingdom: Animalia
- Phylum: Arthropoda
- Class: Insecta
- Order: Coleoptera
- Suborder: Adephaga
- Family: Carabidae
- Tribe: Pterostichini
- Subtribe: Pterostichina
- Genus: Plocamostethus; Britton, 1940

= Plocamostethus =

Genus of beetles

Plocamostethus is a genus of beetles in the family Carabidae. It is endemic to New Zealand. The genus contains the following species:

- Plocamostethus planiusculus (White 1846)
- Plocamostethus scribae Johns, 2007
