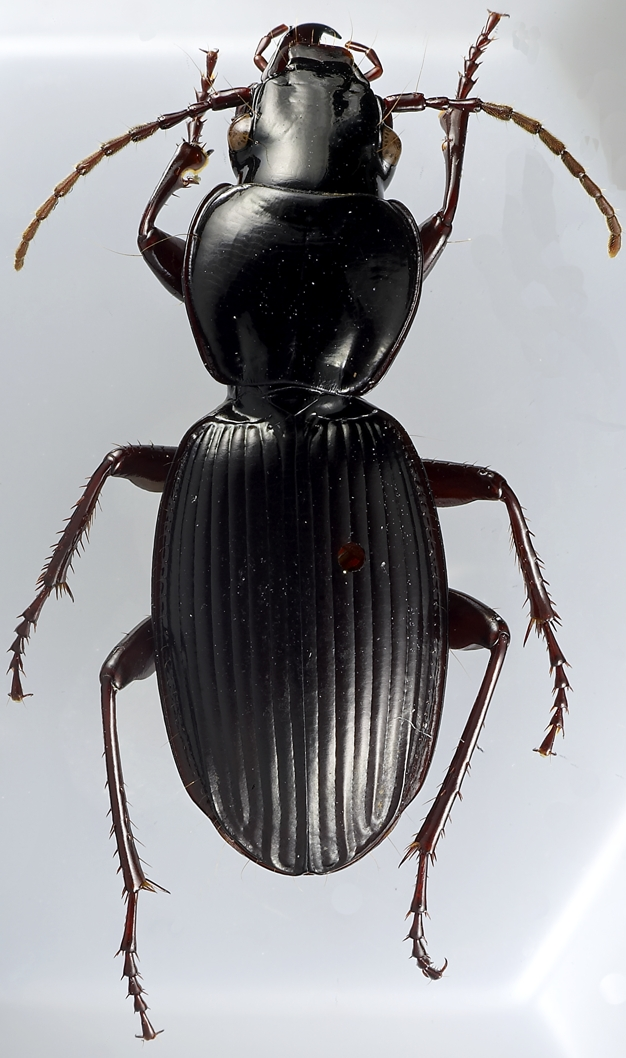

Scientific classification
- Domain: Eukaryota
- Kingdom: Animalia
- Phylum: Arthropoda
- Class: Insecta
- Order: Coleoptera
- Suborder: Adephaga
- Family: Carabidae
- Subfamily: Pterostichinae
- Tribe: Pterostichini
- Subtribe: Pterostichina
- Genus: Notabax; B.Moore, 1976
- Species: N. monteithi

Binomial name
- Notabax monteithi B.Moore, 1976

= Notabax =

Genus of beetles

Notabax is a genus in the ground beetle family Carabidae. This genus has a single species, Notabax monteithi. It is found in Australia.
