= Kuschelinus =

Scientific classification
- Kingdom: Animalia
- Phylum: Arthropoda
- Class: Insecta
- Order: Coleoptera
- Suborder: Adephaga
- Family: Carabidae
- Tribe: Pterostichini
- Subtribe: Metiina
- Genus: Kuschelinus; Straneo, 1963
- Species: K. insularis

Binomial name
- Kuschelinus insularis Straneo, 1963

Genus of beetles

Kuschelinus is a genus in the ground beetle family Carabidae. This genus has a single species, Kuschelinus insularis. It is found in Chile.
