= Inkosa =

Scientific classification
- Kingdom: Animalia
- Phylum: Arthropoda
- Class: Insecta
- Order: Coleoptera
- Suborder: Adephaga
- Family: Carabidae
- Subfamily: Pterostichinae
- Tribe: Pterostichini
- Subtribe: Abacetina
- Genus: Inkosa; Péringuey, 1926

Genus of beetles

Inkosa is a genus in the ground beetle family Carabidae. There are at least two described species in Inkosa, found in South Africa.

== Species ==
These two species belong to the genus Inkosa:

- Inkosa latiuscula Péringuey, 1926
- Inkosa minor Straneo, 1995
