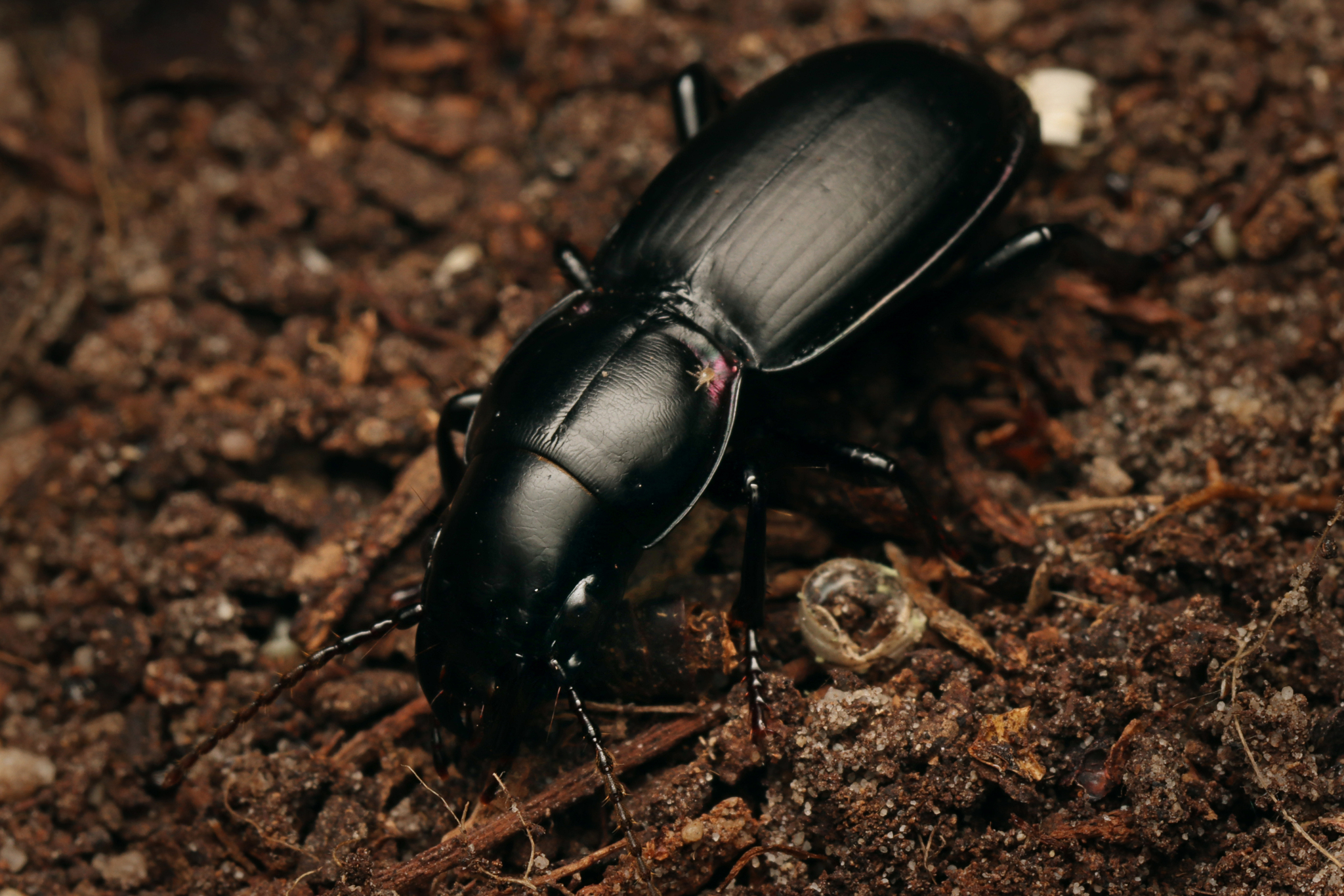
- Secatophus australis

Scientific classification
- Domain: Eukaryota
- Kingdom: Animalia
- Phylum: Arthropoda
- Class: Insecta
- Order: Coleoptera
- Suborder: Adephaga
- Family: Carabidae
- Tribe: Pterostichini
- Subtribe: Pterostichina
- Genus: Secatophus; Laporte, 1867
- Species: S. australis

Binomial name
- Secatophus australis (Hope, 1845)

Synonyms
- Hoploprion Tschitscherine, 1903; Hoploprionx Tschitscherine, 1903; Prionophorus Chaudoir, 1865

= Secatophus =

Genus of beetles

Secatophus is a genus in the ground beetle family Carabidae. This genus has a single species, Secatophus australis. It is found in Australia.
