= Aristopus =

Scientific classification
- Kingdom: Animalia
- Phylum: Arthropoda
- Class: Insecta
- Order: Coleoptera
- Suborder: Adephaga
- Family: Carabidae
- Subfamily: Pterostichinae
- Tribe: Pterostichini
- Subtribe: Abacetina
- Genus: Aristopus; LaFerté-Sénectère, 1853

Genus of beetles

Aristopus is a genus in the beetle family Carabidae. There are more than 20 described species in Aristopus.

== Species ==
These 25 species belong to the genus Aristopus:

- Aristopus angolanus (Straneo, 1948) (Democratic Republic of the Congo and Angola)
- Aristopus basilewskyi (Straneo, 1948) (Africa)
- Aristopus bicolor (Straneo, 1948) (Cameroon, Democratic Republic of the Congo, Uganda)
- Aristopus binotatus (Jeannel, 1948) (Madagascar)
- Aristopus bipustulatus (Brullé, 1835) (Madagascar)
- Aristopus collarti (Straneo, 1948) (Democratic Republic of the Congo, Burundi)
- Aristopus decorus (Straneo, 1956) (South Africa)
- Aristopus distigma (Tschitscherine, 1898) (Mozambique, Zimbabwe, South Africa)
- Aristopus elisabethanus (Burgeon, 1935) (Democratic Republic of the Congo)
- Aristopus immaculatus (Jeannel, 1948) (Madagascar)
- Aristopus lamottei (Straneo, 1963) (Guinea, Ivory Coast, Cameroon)
- Aristopus latithorax (Gemminger & Harold, 1868) (Guinea-Bissau)
- Aristopus longicornis (Péringuey, 1898) (Zimbabwe and South Africa)
- Aristopus maculatus (Straneo, 1939) (Africa)
- Aristopus minor (Straneo, 1951) (Africa)
- Aristopus mirei Straneo, 1983 (Ivory Coast and Cameroon)
- Aristopus mocquerysi (Jeannel, 1948) (Madagascar)
- Aristopus nairobianus (Straneo, 1948) (Kenya)
- Aristopus natalensis Straneo, 1983 (South Africa)
- Aristopus punctatellus Straneo, 1983 (Ivory Coast)
- Aristopus puncticollis (Straneo, 1959) (Democratic Republic of the Congo)
- Aristopus robustus (Straneo, 1951) (Cameroon and Democratic Republic of the Congo)
- Aristopus submarginatus (Straneo, 1963) (Africa)
- Aristopus trimaculatus LaFerté-Sénectère, 1853 (Africa)
- Aristopus ugandanus (Straneo, 1948) (Democratic Republic of the Congo, Uganda, South Africa)
