= Castelnaudia =

Scientific classification
- Domain: Eukaryota
- Kingdom: Animalia
- Phylum: Arthropoda
- Class: Insecta
- Order: Coleoptera
- Suborder: Adephaga
- Family: Carabidae
- Subfamily: Pterostichinae
- Tribe: Pterostichini
- Subtribe: Pterostichina
- Genus: Castelnaudia; Tschitscherine, 1891

Synonyms
- Castelneaudia Tschitscherin, 1902; Nesopterostichus Tschitscherin, 1902; Omocycla Tschitscherine, 1902; Protodromus Moore, 1965; Pterostichus Broun

Genus of beetles

Castelnaudia is a genus in the ground beetle family Carabidae. There are about 17 described species in Castelnaudia, found in Australia.

== Species ==
These 17 species belong to the genus Castelnaudia:

- Castelnaudia cordata (Chaudoir, 1865)
- Castelnaudia cyanea (Laporte, 1840)
- Castelnaudia cyaneotincta (Boisduval, 1835)
- Castelnaudia eungella (Darlington, 1962)
- Castelnaudia hecate (Tschitscherine, 1901)
- Castelnaudia kirrama (Darlington, 1962)
- Castelnaudia marginifera (Chaudoir, 1865)
- Castelnaudia mixta (Darlington, 1962)
- Castelnaudia obscuripennis (W.J.MacLeay, 1887)
- Castelnaudia porphyriaca (Sloane, 1900)
- Castelnaudia queenslandica (Csiki, 1930)
- Castelnaudia septemcostata (Chaudoir, 1875)
- Castelnaudia setosiceps (Sloane, 1923)
- Castelnaudia spec (Darlington, 1962)
- Castelnaudia speciosa Sloane, 1911
- Castelnaudia superba (Laporte, 1867)
- Castelnaudia wilsoni (Laporte, 1867)
