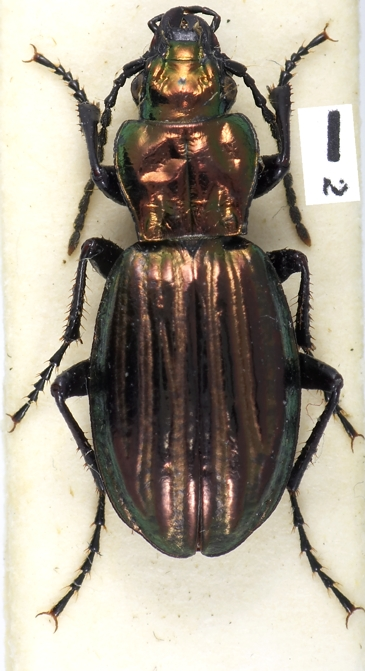
- Aristochroa venusta

Scientific classification
- Domain: Eukaryota
- Kingdom: Animalia
- Phylum: Arthropoda
- Class: Insecta
- Order: Coleoptera
- Suborder: Adephaga
- Family: Carabidae
- Subfamily: Pterostichinae
- Tribe: Pterostichini
- Subtribe: Pterostichina
- Genus: Aristochroa; Tschitscherine, 1898

= Aristochroa =

Genus of beetles

Aristochroa is a genus in the beetle family Carabidae. There are more than 30 described species in Aristochroa. These species are from China, except for Aristochroa watanabei which is found in Myanmar.

== Species ==
These 32 species belong to the genus Aristochroa:

- Aristochroa aba Tian, 2004 (China)
- Aristochroa abrupta Kavanaugh & Liang, 2003 (China)
- Aristochroa balangensis Xie & Yu, 1993 (China)
- Aristochroa casta Tschitscherine, 1898 (China)
- Aristochroa chuanxiensis Tian, 2004 (China)
- Aristochroa deqinensis Xie & Yu, 1993 (China)
- Aristochroa deuvei Xie & Yu, 1993 (China)
- Aristochroa dimorpha Zamotajlov & Fedorenko, 2000 (China)
- Aristochroa exochopleurae Kavanaugh & Liang, 2006 (China)
- Aristochroa freyi Straneo, 1938 (China)
- Aristochroa gratiosa Tschitscherine, 1898 (China)
- Aristochroa kangdingensis Zamotajlov & Fedorenko, 2000 (China)
- Aristochroa kaznakovi Tschitscherine, 1903 (China)
- Aristochroa lama Tian, 2004 (China)
- Aristochroa lanpingensis Tian, 2004 (China)
- Aristochroa latecostata (Fairmaire, 1887) (China)
- Aristochroa longiphallus Tian, 2004 (China)
- Aristochroa militaris Sciaky & Wrase, 1997 (China)
- Aristochroa morvani Tian, 2004 (China)
- Aristochroa mosuo Tian, 2004 (China)
- Aristochroa nozari Azadbakhsh, 2017 (China)
- Aristochroa panda Tian, 2004 (China)
- Aristochroa perelegans Tschitscherine, 1898 (China)
- Aristochroa poecilma (Andrewes, 1937) (China)
- Aristochroa sciakyi Zamotajlov & Fedorenko, 2000 (China)
- Aristochroa splendida Kavanaugh & Liang, 2006 (China)
- Aristochroa venusta Tschitscherine, 1898 (China)
- Aristochroa venustoides Xie & Yu, 1993 (China)
- Aristochroa wangi Xie & Yu, 1993 (China)
- Aristochroa watanabei Ito & Imura, 2005 (Myanmar)
- Aristochroa yuae Kavanaugh & Liang, 2006 (China)
- Aristochroa zhongdianensis Liang & Yu, 2002 (China)
