= Feroniola =

Scientific classification
- Domain: Eukaryota
- Kingdom: Animalia
- Phylum: Arthropoda
- Class: Insecta
- Order: Coleoptera
- Suborder: Adephaga
- Family: Carabidae
- Subfamily: Pterostichinae
- Tribe: Pterostichini
- Subtribe: Metiina
- Genus: Feroniola; Tschitscherine, 1900

Genus of beetles

Feroniola is a genus in the beetle family Carabidae. There are about 10 described species in Feroniola, found in South America.

== Species ==
These 10 species belong to the genus Feroniola:

- Feroniola bradytoides (Fairmaire, 1884) (Chile and Argentina)
- Feroniola famelica Tschitscherine, 1900 (Argentina)
- Feroniola kulti Straneo, 1952 (Bolivia)
- Feroniola laticollis (Solier, 1849) (Chile and Uruguay)
- Feroniola minor Straneo, 1967 (Argentina)
- Feroniola puncticollis (Putzeys, 1875) (Chile)
- Feroniola reichardti Straneo, 1995 (Brazil)
- Feroniola subamaroides (Rousseau, 1900)
- Feroniola subsinuata Straneo, 1967 (Argentina)
- Feroniola zischkai Straneo, 1952 (Bolivia)
