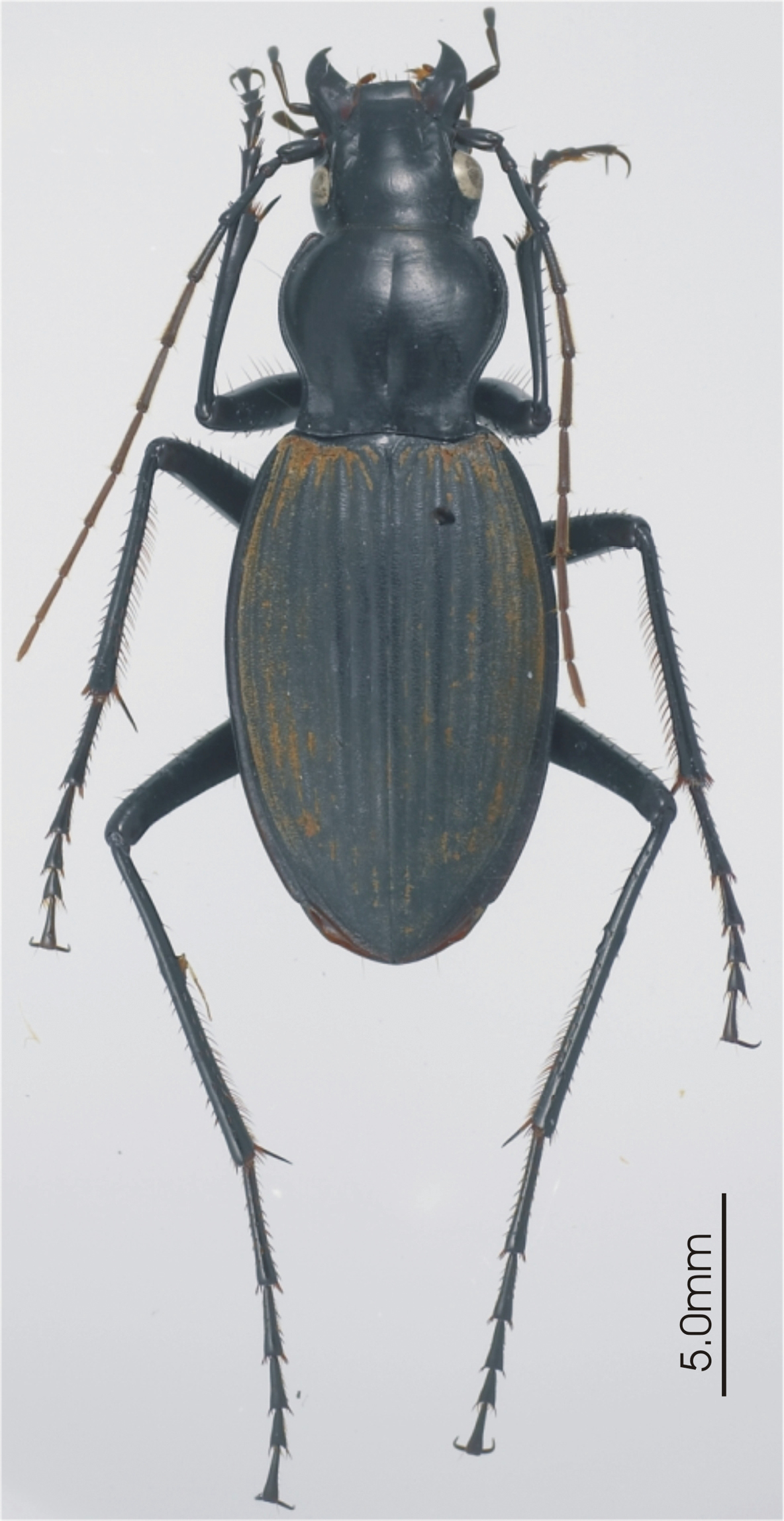

Scientific classification
- Domain: Eukaryota
- Kingdom: Animalia
- Phylum: Arthropoda
- Class: Insecta
- Order: Coleoptera
- Suborder: Adephaga
- Family: Carabidae
- Subfamily: Pterostichinae
- Tribe: Pterostichini
- Subtribe: Pterostichina
- Genus: Sphodrosomus; Perroud, 1864

= Sphodrosomus =

Genus of beetles

Sphodrosomus is a genus in the ground beetle family Carabidae. There are at least three described species in Sphodrosomus, found in New Caledonia.

== Species ==
These three species belong to the genus Sphodrosomus:

- Sphodrosomus griseolus (Fauvel, 1882)
- Sphodrosomus monteithi Will, 2006
- Sphodrosomus saisseti Perroud, 1864
