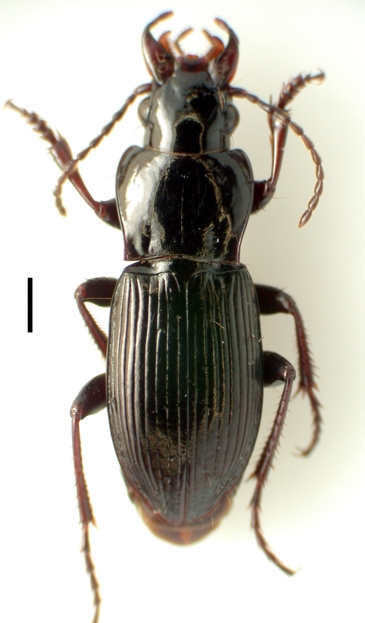
- Trirammatus skottsbergi

Scientific classification
- Domain: Eukaryota
- Kingdom: Animalia
- Phylum: Arthropoda
- Class: Insecta
- Order: Coleoptera
- Suborder: Adephaga
- Family: Carabidae
- Subfamily: Pterostichinae
- Tribe: Pterostichini
- Subtribe: Euchroina
- Genus: Trirammatus; Chaudoir, 1835

Subgenera
- Meraulax Tschitscherine, 1900; Plagioplatys Tschitscherine, 1900; Trirammatus Chaudoir, 1835

= Trirammatus =

Genus of beetles

Trirammatus is a genus in the beetle family Carabidae. There are about 11 described species in Trirammatus, found mainly in South America.

== Species ==
These 11 species belong to the genus Trirammatus:

- Trirammatus alatus (Brullé, 1838) (Argentina)
- Trirammatus chaudoiri (Guérin-Méneville, 1838) (Peru)
- Trirammatus ignobilis (Chaudoir, 1876) (Chile)
- Trirammatus lacordairei (Dejean, 1831) (Argentina)
- Trirammatus loxandroides (Straneo, 1951) (Argentina)
- Trirammatus pseudharpalus (Emden, 1958) (Argentina)
- Trirammatus selkirki (Andrewes, 1931) (Chile)
- Trirammatus skottsbergi (Andrewes, 1931) (Chile)
- Trirammatus torqueotrochantus Will, 2004
- Trirammatus unistriatus (Dejean, 1828) (Chile, Argentina, and Brazil)
- Trirammatus vagans (Dejean, 1831) (Argentina and Uruguay)
