= Teratotarsa =

Scientific classification
- Domain: Eukaryota
- Kingdom: Animalia
- Phylum: Arthropoda
- Class: Insecta
- Order: Coleoptera
- Suborder: Adephaga
- Family: Carabidae
- Subfamily: Pterostichinae
- Tribe: Pterostichini
- Subtribe: Pterostichina
- Genus: Teratotarsa; Tschitscherine, 1893

Genus of beetles

Teratotarsa is a genus of in the beetle family Carabidae. There are four described species in Teratotarsa, found in South Africa.

== Species ==
These species belong to the genus Teratotarsa:

- Teratotarsa crenicollis Straneo, 1965
- Teratotarsa minor Peringuey, 1926
- Teratotarsa schouberti Tschitscherine, 1893
- Teratotarsa superciliaris (Peringuey, 1926)
