= Speomolops =

Scientific classification
- Domain: Eukaryota
- Kingdom: Animalia
- Phylum: Arthropoda
- Class: Insecta
- Order: Coleoptera
- Suborder: Adephaga
- Family: Carabidae
- Tribe: Pterostichini
- Subtribe: Pterostichina
- Genus: Speomolops; Patrizi, 1955
- Species: S. sardous

Binomial name
- Speomolops sardous Patrizi, 1955

Genus of beetles

Speomolops is a genus in the ground beetle family Carabidae. This genus has a single species, Speomolops sardous. It is found in Italy, including Sardinia.
