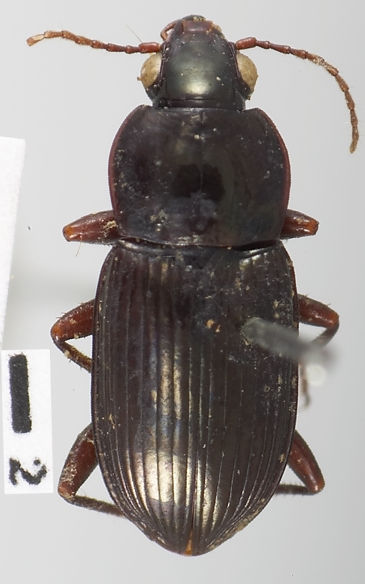
- Pseudabarys columbicus

Scientific classification
- Domain: Eukaryota
- Kingdom: Animalia
- Phylum: Arthropoda
- Class: Insecta
- Order: Coleoptera
- Suborder: Adephaga
- Family: Carabidae
- Subfamily: Pterostichinae
- Tribe: Pterostichini
- Subtribe: Euchroina
- Genus: Pseudabarys; Chaudoir, 1874

Synonyms
- Pseudabaris Csiki, 1930

= Pseudabarys =

Genus of beetles

Pseudabarys is a genus in the ground beetle family Carabidae. There are about six described species in Pseudabarys, found in Mexico and South America.

== Species ==
These six species belong to the genus Pseudabarys:

- Pseudabarys brasiliensis (Chaudoir, 1874) (Brazil)
- Pseudabarys columbicus (Chaudoir, 1874) (Venezuela)
- Pseudabarys lebasi (Chaudoir, 1874) (Colombia)
- Pseudabarys mexicanus (Chaudoir, 1874) (Mexico)
- Pseudabarys robustus (Bates, 1871) (Brazil)
- Pseudabarys substriatus (Chaudoir, 1874) (Mexico)
