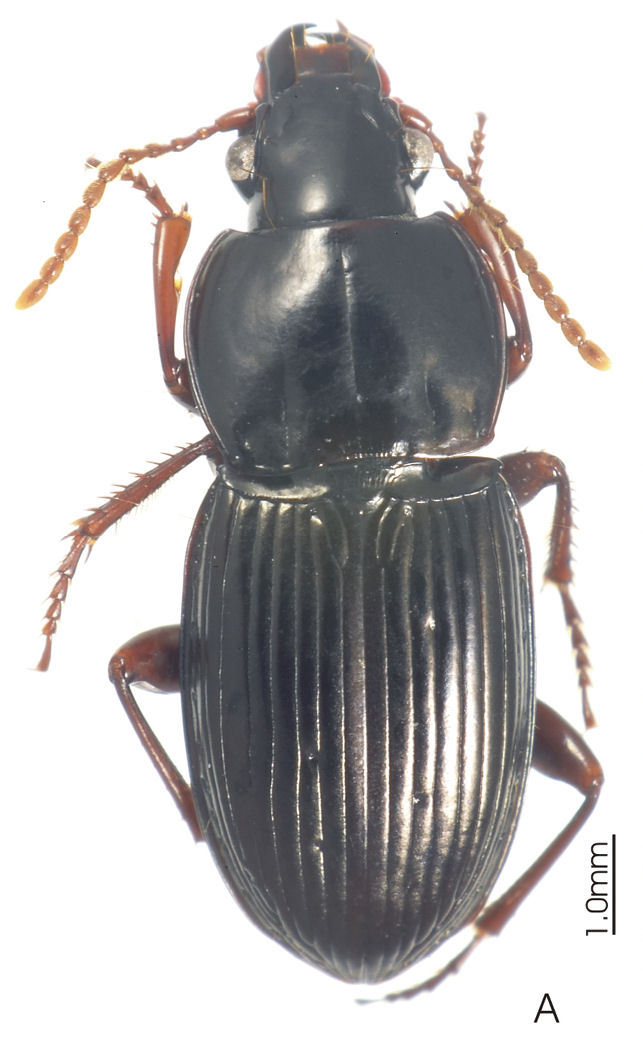
- Prosopogmus lescheni

Scientific classification
- Domain: Eukaryota
- Kingdom: Animalia
- Phylum: Arthropoda
- Class: Insecta
- Order: Coleoptera
- Suborder: Adephaga
- Family: Carabidae
- Subfamily: Pterostichinae
- Tribe: Pterostichini
- Subtribe: Euchroina
- Genus: Prosopogmus; Chaudoir, 1865

= Prosopogmus =

Genus of beetles

Prosopogmus is a genus in the beetle family Carabidae. There are more than 30 described species in Prosopogmus.

== Species ==
These 34 species belong to the genus Prosopogmus:

- Prosopogmus aoupiniensis Will, 2011 (New Caledonia)
- Prosopogmus austrinus Sloane, 1895 (Australia)
- Prosopogmus batjanicus Straneo, 1955 (Indonesia)
- Prosopogmus boisduvalii (Laporte, 1867) (Australia)
- Prosopogmus chalybeipennis (Chaudoir, 1843) (Australia)
- Prosopogmus delicatulus (Tschitscherine, 1898) (Australia)
- Prosopogmus fortis Will, 2011 (New Caledonia)
- Prosopogmus foveipennis (W.J.MacLeay, 1871) (Australia)
- Prosopogmus garavagliae Straneo, 1938 (Indonesia and New Guinea)
- Prosopogmus harpaloides (Chaudoir, 1875) (Australia)
- Prosopogmus hornabrooki Darlington, 1971 (New Guinea)
- Prosopogmus impressifrons (Chaudoir, 1865) (Australia)
- Prosopogmus insperatus Sloane, 1896 (Australia)
- Prosopogmus interstitialis Sloane, 1923 (Australia)
- Prosopogmus irideus (Fauvel, 1903) (New Caledonia)
- Prosopogmus koghisensis Will, 2011 (New Caledonia)
- Prosopogmus leai Sloane, 1920 (Australia)
- Prosopogmus lescheni Will, 2011 (New Caledonia)
- Prosopogmus monochrous (Chaudoir, 1865) (Australia)
- Prosopogmus namoyensis Sloane, 1895 (Australia)
- Prosopogmus nitidipennis (W.J.MacLeay, 1871)
- Prosopogmus occidentalis (W.J.MacLeay, 1888) (Australia)
- Prosopogmus oodiformis (W.J.MacLeay, 1871) (Australia and New Zealand)
- Prosopogmus opacidermis Sloane, 1923 (Australia)
- Prosopogmus punctifer Sloane, 1920 (Australia)
- Prosopogmus reichei (Laporte, 1867) (Australia)
- Prosopogmus rubricornis Sloane, 1895 (Australia)
- Prosopogmus savesi (Fauvel, 1882) (New Caledonia)
- Prosopogmus sedlacekorum Darlington, 1971 (New Guinea)
- Prosopogmus speculiferus (Fairmaire, 1879) (Fiji)
- Prosopogmus sulcatulus (Chaudoir, 1874) (Australia)
- Prosopogmus suspectus (Chaudoir, 1878) (Australia)
- Prosopogmus tasmanicus Sloane, 1920 (Australia)
- Prosopogmus yarrensis Sloane, 1915 (Australia)
