= Piesmus =

Scientific classification
- Kingdom: Animalia
- Phylum: Arthropoda
- Class: Insecta
- Order: Coleoptera
- Suborder: Adephaga
- Family: Carabidae
- Tribe: Pterostichini
- Subtribe: Pterostichina
- Genus: Piesmus; LeConte, 1852
- Species: P. submarginatus

Binomial name
- Piesmus submarginatus (Say, 1823)

Genus of beetles

Piesmus submarginatus is a species of beetle in the family Carabidae, the only species in the genus Piesmus.

Their habitat is under dead pine bark in mesophilous forests.

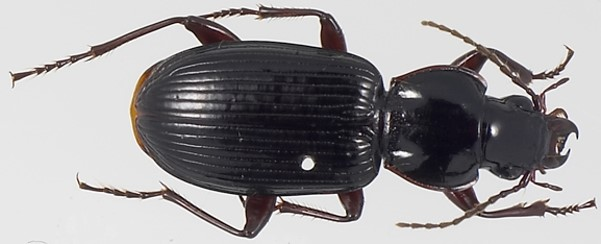
Female adult Piesmus submarginatus found in Florida
