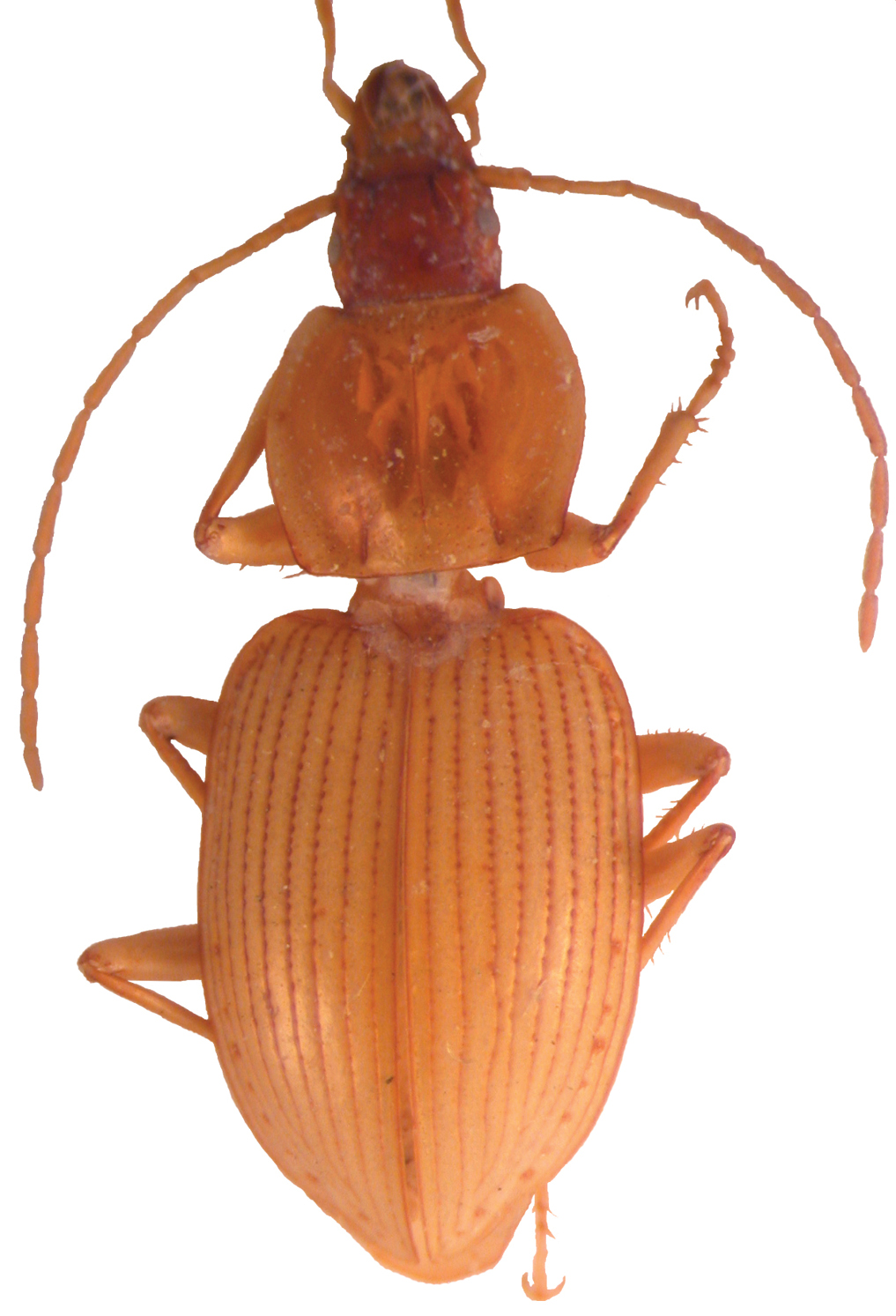

Scientific classification
- Domain: Eukaryota
- Kingdom: Animalia
- Phylum: Arthropoda
- Class: Insecta
- Order: Coleoptera
- Suborder: Adephaga
- Family: Carabidae
- Subfamily: Pterostichinae
- Tribe: Pterostichini
- Subtribe: Abacetina
- Genus: Mateuellus; Deuve, 1990
- Species: M. troglobioticus

Binomial name
- Mateuellus troglobioticus (Deuve, 1990)

Synonyms
- Mateuius Deuve, 1990

= Mateuellus =

Genus of beetles

Mateuellus is a genus in the ground beetle family Carabidae. This genus has a single species, Mateuellus troglobioticus. It is found in Indonesia.
