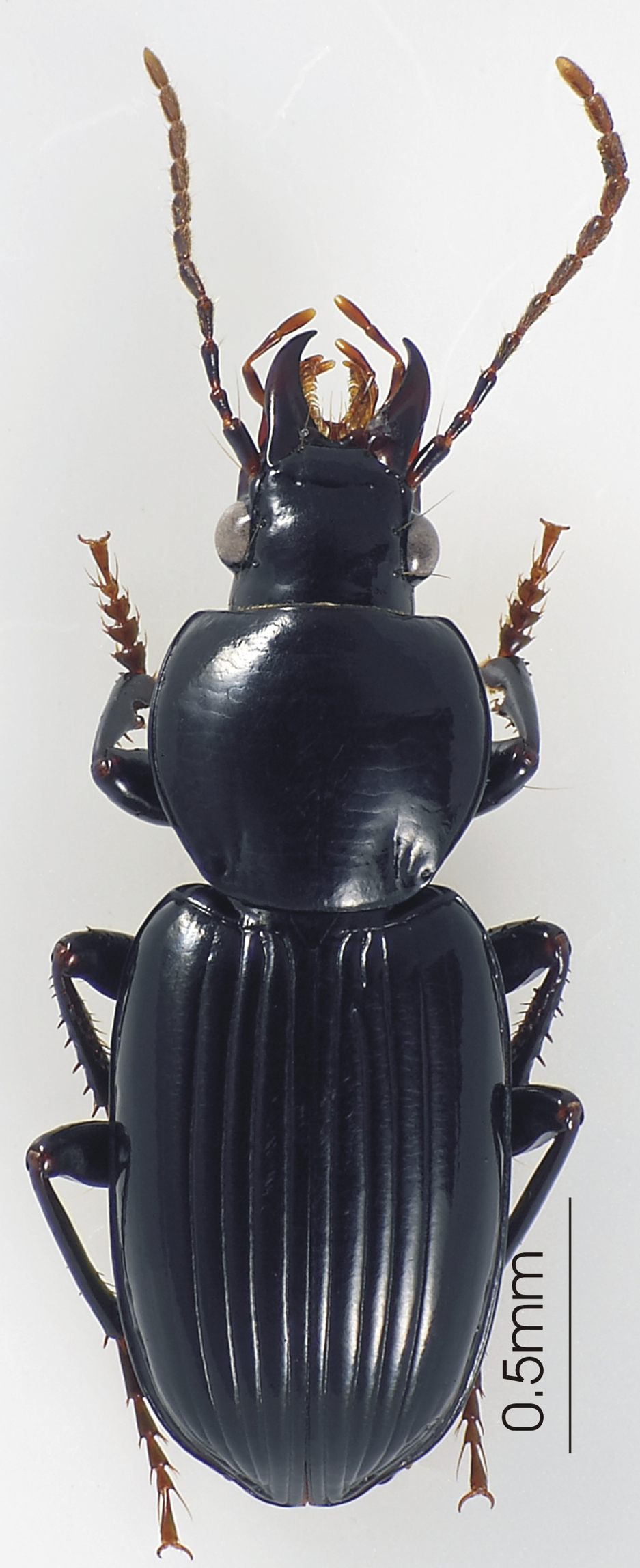

Scientific classification
- Domain: Eukaryota
- Kingdom: Animalia
- Phylum: Arthropoda
- Class: Insecta
- Order: Coleoptera
- Suborder: Adephaga
- Family: Carabidae
- Subfamily: Pterostichinae
- Tribe: Pterostichini
- Subtribe: Pterostichina
- Genus: Darodilia; Laporte, 1867

= Darodilia =

Genus of beetles

Darodilia is a genus in the beetle family Carabidae. There are about 10 described species in Darodilia, found in Australia.

== Species ==
These 10 species belong to the genus Darodilia:

- Darodilia castelnaui W.J.MacLeay, 1888
- Darodilia curta Sloane, 1915
- Darodilia emarginata Sloane, 1898
- Darodilia liopleura (Chaudoir, 1870)
- Darodilia longula Tschitscherine, 1902
- Darodilia macilenta Sloane, 1895
- Darodilia mandibularis Laporte, 1867
- Darodilia ovicollis (W.J.MacLeay, 1871)
- Darodilia robusta Sloane, 1900
- Darodilia rugisternis Sloane, 1895
