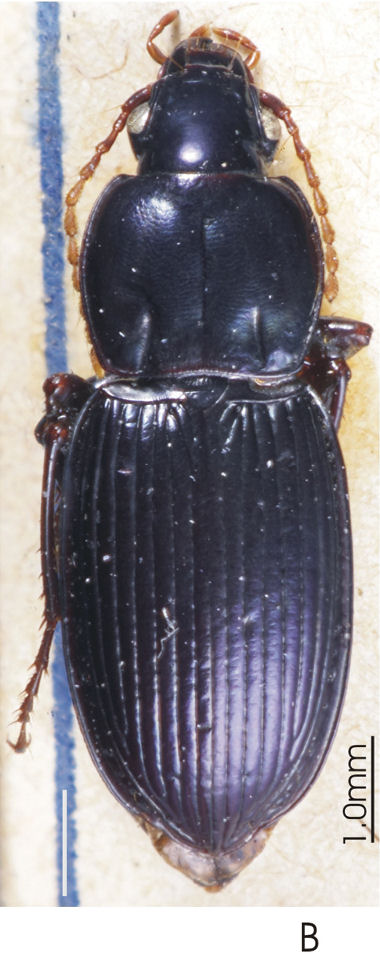
- Pseudoceneus irideus

Scientific classification
- Domain: Eukaryota
- Kingdom: Animalia
- Phylum: Arthropoda
- Class: Insecta
- Order: Coleoptera
- Suborder: Adephaga
- Family: Carabidae
- Subfamily: Pterostichinae
- Tribe: Pterostichini
- Subtribe: Pterostichina
- Genus: Pseudoceneus; Tschitscherine, 1891

Subgenera
- Poeciliridius Straneo, 1937; Pseudoceneus Tschitscherine, 1891

= Pseudoceneus =

Genus of beetles

Pseudoceneus is a genus in the beetle family Carabidae. There are about five described species in Pseudoceneus.

== Species ==
These five species belong to the genus Pseudoceneus:

- Pseudoceneus beatricis Giachino, 2005 (Australia)
- Pseudoceneus iridescens (Laporte, 1867) (Australia)
- Pseudoceneus norfolkensis B.Moore, 1985 (Australia)
- Pseudoceneus numeensis Fauvel, 1903 (New Caledonia)
- Pseudoceneus sollicitus (Erichson, 1842) (Australia)
