= Oscadytes =

Scientific classification
- Domain: Eukaryota
- Kingdom: Animalia
- Phylum: Arthropoda
- Class: Insecta
- Order: Coleoptera
- Suborder: Adephaga
- Family: Carabidae
- Tribe: Pterostichini
- Subtribe: Pterostichina
- Genus: Oscadytes; Lagar Mascaro, 1975
- Species: O. rovirai

Binomial name
- Oscadytes rovirai Lagar Mascaro, 1975

Genus of beetles

Oscadytes is a genus in the ground beetle family Carabidae. This genus has a single species, Oscadytes rovirai. It is found in Spain.
