= Chlaeminus =

Scientific classification
- Kingdom: Animalia
- Phylum: Arthropoda
- Class: Insecta
- Order: Coleoptera
- Suborder: Adephaga
- Family: Carabidae
- Subfamily: Pterostichinae
- Tribe: Pterostichini
- Subtribe: Abacetina
- Genus: Chlaeminus; Motschulsky, 1865

Subgenera
- Chlaeminellus Straneo, 1954; Chlaeminus Motschulsky, 1865

Synonyms
- Chlaeminellus Straneo, 1954

Genus of beetles

Chlaeminus is a genus in the ground beetle family Carabidae. There are about 16 described species in Chlaeminus, found in Africa and Asia.

== Species ==
These 16 species belong to the genus Chlaeminus:

- Chlaeminus annamensis Tschitscherine, 1903 (Japan, Vietnam)
- Chlaeminus biguttatus Motschulsky, 1865 (Sri Lanka, India, Myanmar, Thailand, Cambodia, Indonesia)
- Chlaeminus biplagiatus Chaudoir, 1870 (Bangladesh, India, Myanmar)
- Chlaeminus cruciatus Chaudoir, 1870 (India)
- Chlaeminus fasciatus Straneo, 1954 (Vietnam)
- Chlaeminus flavoguttatus (Motschulsky, 1865) (Myanmar, Thailand)
- Chlaeminus kedirensis Andrewes, 1936 (Indonesia)
- Chlaeminus obscurus Straneo, 1951 (DR Congo)
- Chlaeminus quadriplagiatus Chaudoir, 1870 (Bangladesh, Myanmar, Vietnam)
- Chlaeminus reductus Straneo, 1940 (DR Congo)
- Chlaeminus senegalensis Straneo, 1939 (Senegal, Ivory Coast, Chad)
- Chlaeminus sexmaculatus Straneo, 1948 (Senegal, Mali, Sudan)
- Chlaeminus sparsepunctatus Jedlicka, 1935 (Philippines)
- Chlaeminus tetrastictus Andrewes, 1936 (Indonesia)
- Chlaeminus unipustulatus Straneo, 1979 (Ethiopia)
- Chlaeminus variegatus Straneo, 1939 (Zambia)
