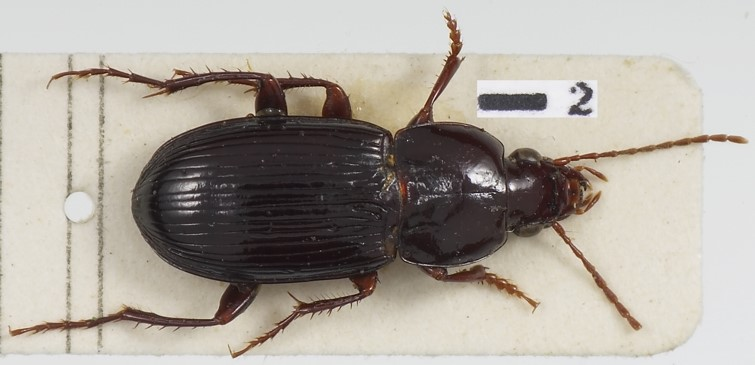
- Simodontus australis

Scientific classification
- Domain: Eukaryota
- Kingdom: Animalia
- Phylum: Arthropoda
- Class: Insecta
- Order: Coleoptera
- Suborder: Adephaga
- Family: Carabidae
- Subfamily: Pterostichinae
- Tribe: Pterostichini
- Subtribe: Euchroina
- Genus: Simodontus; Chaudoir, 1843

Subgenera
- Simodontus Chaudoir, 1843; Trochoglymmus Straneo, 1937

= Simodontus =

Genus of beetles

Simodontus is a genus in the beetle family Carabidae. There are about 18 described species in Simodontus, found in Australia.

== Species ==
These 18 species belong to the genus Simodontus:

- Simodontus aeneipennis Chaudoir, 1843
- Simodontus australis (Dejean, 1828)
- Simodontus brunnicolor Lorenz, 1998
- Simodontus clermonti (Straneo, 1937)
- Simodontus convexus Chaudoir, 1874
- Simodontus curtulus Chaudoir, 1874
- Simodontus fortnumi (Laporte, 1867)
- Simodontus grandiceps Sloane, 1900
- Simodontus holomelanus (Germar, 1848)
- Simodontus laeviceps Sloane, 1900
- Simodontus leai Sloane, 1898
- Simodontus murrayensis Blackburn, 1890
- Simodontus occultus Sloane, 1898
- Simodontus picescens Chaudoir, 1874
- Simodontus rotundipennis (Laporte, 1867)
- Simodontus rufipalpis (Laporte, 1867)
- Simodontus sexfoveatus (Chaudoir, 1878)
- Simodontus transfuga Chaudoir, 1874
