= Colpodichius =

Scientific classification
- Kingdom: Animalia
- Phylum: Arthropoda
- Class: Insecta
- Order: Coleoptera
- Suborder: Adephaga
- Family: Carabidae
- Subfamily: Pterostichinae
- Tribe: Pterostichini
- Subtribe: Abacetina
- Genus: Colpodichius; Straneo, 1952
- Species: C. platyderoides

Binomial name
- Colpodichius platyderoides Straneo, 1952

Genus of beetles

Colpodichius is a genus in the ground beetle family Carabidae. This genus has a single species, Colpodichius platyderoides. It is found in Guinea and Ivory Coast.
