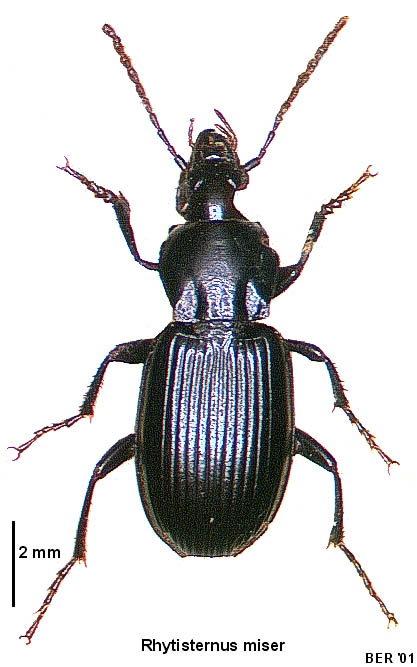
- Rhytisternus miser

Scientific classification
- Domain: Eukaryota
- Kingdom: Animalia
- Phylum: Arthropoda
- Class: Insecta
- Order: Coleoptera
- Suborder: Adephaga
- Family: Carabidae
- Subfamily: Pterostichinae
- Tribe: Pterostichini
- Subtribe: Pterostichina
- Genus: Rhytisternus; Chaudoir, 1865

= Rhytisternus =

Genus of beetles

Rhytisternus is a genus in the beetle family Carabidae. There are more than 20 described species in Rhytisternus.

== Species ==
These 25 species belong to the genus Rhytisternus:

- Rhytisternus angustulus W.J.MacLeay, 1888 (Australia)
- Rhytisternus arnheimensis (Laporte, 1867) (Australia)
- Rhytisternus bovilli Blackburn, 1890 (Australia)
- Rhytisternus callabonnensis Sloane, 1895 (Australia)
- Rhytisternus cardwellensis Blackburn, 1892 (Australia)
- Rhytisternus carpentarius Sloane, 1895 (Australia)
- Rhytisternus cyathoderus (Chaudoir, 1865) (Australia)
- Rhytisternus externus Baehr, 2017 (Indonesia)
- Rhytisternus froggatti (W.J.MacLeay, 1888) (Australia)
- Rhytisternus gigas Sloane, 1895 (Australia)
- Rhytisternus laevidorsis (Tschitscherine, 1891) (Australia)
- Rhytisternus laevilaterus (Chaudoir, 1865) (Australia)
- Rhytisternus laevis (W.J.MacLeay, 1883) (New Guinea, Papua, and Australia)
- Rhytisternus limbatus W.J.MacLeay, 1888 (Australia)
- Rhytisternus liopleurus (Chaudoir, 1865) (Australia and New Zealand)
- Rhytisternus mastersii (W.J.MacLeay, 1871) (Australia)
- Rhytisternus miser (Chaudoir, 1865) (Australia and New Zealand)
- Rhytisternus nigellus Sloane, 1895 (Australia)
- Rhytisternus obtusus Sloane, 1895 (Australia)
- Rhytisternus plebeius (Chaudoir, 1875) (Australia)
- Rhytisternus puellus (Chaudoir, 1865) (Australia)
- Rhytisternus solidus Sloane, 1895 (Australia)
- Rhytisternus splendens Blackburn, 1892 (Australia)
- Rhytisternus stuarti Sloane, 1895 (Australia)
- Rhytisternus sulcatipes Blackburn, 1888 (Australia)
