= Cratogaster =

Scientific classification
- Kingdom: Animalia
- Phylum: Arthropoda
- Class: Insecta
- Order: Coleoptera
- Suborder: Adephaga
- Family: Carabidae
- Subfamily: Pterostichinae
- Tribe: Pterostichini
- Subtribe: Pterostichina
- Genus: Cratogaster; Blanchard, 1843

Synonyms
- Cyphosoma Hope, 1842; Pachidius Chaudoir, 1865; Tibarisus Laporte, 1867; Tiribasus Chaudoir, 1878

Genus of beetles

Cratogaster is a genus in the ground beetle family Carabidae. There are about five described species in Cratogaster, found in Australia.

== Species ==
These five species belong to the genus Cratogaster:

- Cratogaster melas (Laporte, 1867)
- Cratogaster occidentalis W.J.MacLeay, 1888
- Cratogaster robusta (W.J.MacLeay, 1883)
- Cratogaster sulcata Blanchard, 1843
- Cratogaster unicolor (Hope, 1842)
