= Ecnomolaus =

Scientific classification
- Domain: Eukaryota
- Kingdom: Animalia
- Phylum: Arthropoda
- Class: Insecta
- Order: Coleoptera
- Suborder: Adephaga
- Family: Carabidae
- Subfamily: Pterostichinae
- Tribe: Pterostichini
- Subtribe: Abacetina
- Genus: Ecnomolaus; Bates, 1892

Genus of beetles

Ecnomolaus is a genus of in the beetle family Carabidae. There are at least two described species in Ecnomolaus.

== Species ==
These two species belong to the genus Ecnomolaus:

- Ecnomolaus clivinoides Bates, 1892 (Myanmar)
- Ecnomolaus dentitibiis (Straneo, 1984) (Cameroon)
