= Camptoscelis =

Scientific classification
- Kingdom: Animalia
- Phylum: Arthropoda
- Class: Insecta
- Order: Coleoptera
- Suborder: Adephaga
- Family: Carabidae
- Subfamily: Pterostichinae
- Tribe: Pterostichini
- Subtribe: Pterostichina
- Genus: Camptoscelis; Dejean, 1828

Genus of beetles

Camptoscelis is a genus of beetles in the family Carabidae, found in South Africa.

== Species ==
- Camptoscelis dissidens Peringuey, 1926
- Camptoscelis hottentotta (Olivier, 1795)
