= Trachelocyphoides =

Trachelocyphoides setulosus

Scientific classification
- Kingdom: Animalia
- Phylum: Arthropoda
- Class: Insecta
- Order: Coleoptera
- Suborder: Adephaga
- Family: Carabidae
- Subfamily: Pterostichinae
- Genus: Trachelocyphoides; Alluaud, 1934
- Species: T. setulosus

Binomial name
- Trachelocyphoides setulosus (Chaudoir, 1878)

Genus of beetles

Trachelocyphoides setulosus is a species of beetle in the family Carabidae, the only species in the genus Trachelocyphoides. It is found in the Democratic Republic of the Congo, Tanzania, and Zimbabwe.
