= Blenniventer =

Blenniventer violaceotinctus

Scientific classification
- Kingdom: Animalia
- Phylum: Arthropoda
- Class: Insecta
- Order: Coleoptera
- Suborder: Adephaga
- Family: Carabidae
- Subfamily: Pterostichinae
- Genus: Blenniventer; Blenniventer
- Species: B. violaceotinctus

Binomial name
- Blenniventer violaceotinctus (Straneo, 1952)

Genus of beetles

Blenniventer violaceotinctus is a species of beetles in the family Carabidae, the only species in the genus Blenniventer.
