= Styracoderus =

Scientific classification
- Domain: Eukaryota
- Kingdom: Animalia
- Phylum: Arthropoda
- Class: Insecta
- Order: Coleoptera
- Suborder: Adephaga
- Family: Carabidae
- Subtribe: Pterostichina
- Genus: Styracoderus; Chaudoir, 1874

Genus of beetles

Styracoderus is a genus of beetles in the family Carabidae, containing the following species:

- Styracoderus atramentarius Rosenhauer, 1856
- Styracoderus azarai Perez Arcas, 1865
- Styracoderus martinezi Vuillefroy, 1868
