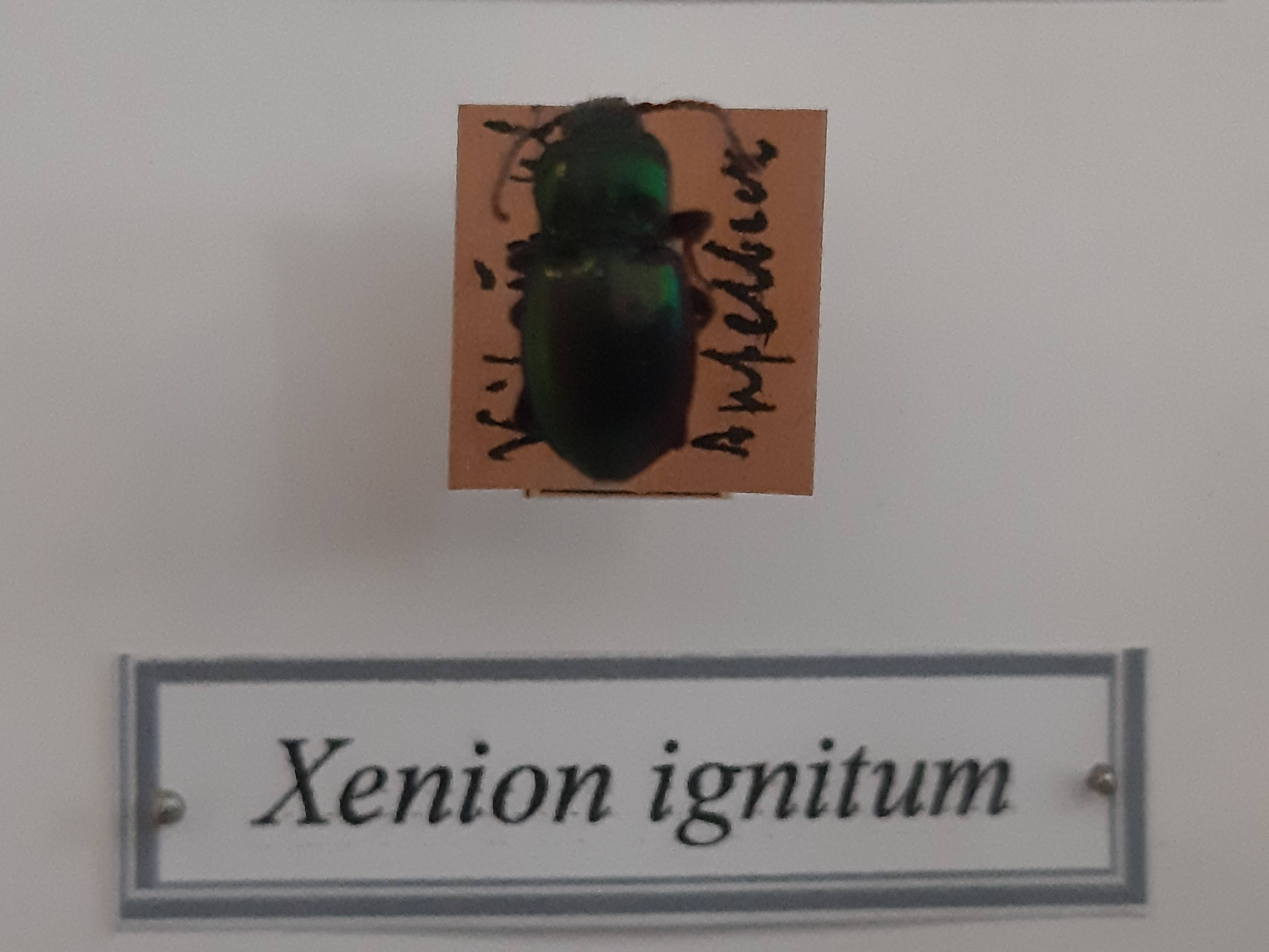

Scientific classification
- Domain: Eukaryota
- Kingdom: Animalia
- Phylum: Arthropoda
- Class: Insecta
- Order: Coleoptera
- Suborder: Adephaga
- Superfamily: Caraboidea
- Family: Carabidae
- Genus: Xenion ignitum
- Species: X. ignitum

Binomial name
- Xenion ignitum (Kraatz, 1875)

= Xenion ignitum =

Species of beetle

Xenion ignitum is a species of ground beetle in the family Carabidae, found in southeast Europe and Turkey.

== Subspecies ==
These two subspecies belong to the species Xenion ignitum:

- Xenion ignitum ignitum (Kraatz, 1875)
- Xenion ignitum laticolle Maran, 1930
