= Abacillodes =

Scientific classification
- Kingdom: Animalia
- Phylum: Arthropoda
- Class: Insecta
- Order: Coleoptera
- Suborder: Adephaga
- Family: Carabidae
- Subfamily: Pterostichinae
- Genus: Abacillodes; Straneo, 1988

Genus of beetles

Abacillodes is a genus of beetles in the family Carabidae, containing the following species:

- Abacillodes jocquei Straneo, 1988
- Abacillodes malawianus Straneo, 1988
