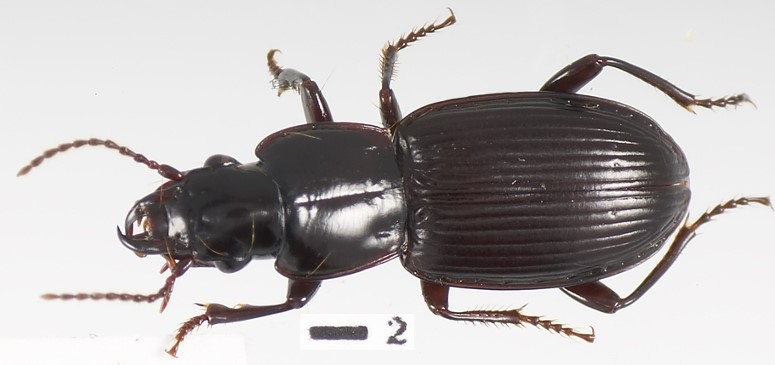
- Allotriopus serratipes

Scientific classification
- Kingdom: Animalia
- Phylum: Arthropoda
- Class: Insecta
- Order: Coleoptera
- Suborder: Adephaga
- Family: Carabidae
- Subfamily: Pterostichinae
- Genus: Allotriopus; Bates, 1882

= Allotriopus =

Genus of beetles

Allotriopus is a genus of beetles in the family Carabidae, containing the following species:

- Allotriopus ashei (Ball & Roughley, 1982)
- Allotriopus brachypterus (Chaudoir, 1878)
- Allotriopus hallbergi (Ball & Roughley, 1982)
- Allotriopus hemingi (Ball & Roughley, 1982)
- Allotriopus oscitans (Tschitscherine, 1900)
- Allotriopus serratipes (Chaudoir, 1878)
- Allotriopus shpeleyi (Ball & Roughley, 1982)
- Allotriopus taeniola (Bates, 1882)
- Allotriopus triunfo (Ball & Roughley, 1982)
- Allotriopus whiteheadi (Ball & Roughley, 1982)
