= Zariquieya =

Scientific classification
- Kingdom: Animalia
- Phylum: Arthropoda
- Class: Insecta
- Order: Coleoptera
- Suborder: Adephaga
- Family: Carabidae
- Subfamily: Pterostichinae
- Genus: Zariquieya; Jeannel, 1924

Genus of beetles

Zariquieya is a genus of beetles in the family Carabidae, containing the following species:

- Zariquieya boumortensis Faille, Fresneda & Bourdeau, 2011
- Zariquieya troglodytes (Jeannel, 1924)
