= Pollicobius =

Scientific classification
- Kingdom: Animalia
- Phylum: Arthropoda
- Class: Insecta
- Order: Coleoptera
- Suborder: Adephaga
- Family: Carabidae
- Genus: Pollicobius
- Species: P. raymondi

Binomial name
- Pollicobius raymondi Vinson, 1939

Genus of beetles

Pollicobius raymondi is a species of beetle in the family Carabidae, the only species in the genus Pollicobius.
