= Polli =

Polli may refer to:

== Places ==
- Põlli, a village in Märjamaa Parish, Rapla County, in western Estonia
- Polli, Estonia, a village in Mulgi Parish

== People ==
- Andrea Polli (born 1968), environmental artist
- Carlo Polli (born 1989), Swiss footballer
- Emilio Polli (1901–1983), Italian swimmer
- Frida E. Polli, Italian-American neuroscientist and entrepreneur
- Gert-René Polli (born 1960), head of the Austrian Bundesamt für Verfassungsschutz und Terrorismusbekämpfung
- Laura Polli (born 1983), Swiss racewalker
- Lou Polli (1901–2000), American baseball pitcher
- Luan Polli Gomes (born 1993), Brazilian footballer
- Marie Polli (born 1980), Swiss racewalker

== Species ==
- Abacetus polli, a beetle of family Carabidae
- Hyperolius polli, a frog of family Hyperoliidae
- Ichthyococcus polli, a fish of family Phosichthyidae
- Labeo polli, a fish of family Cyprinidae
- Microsynodontis polli, a fish of family Mochokidae
- Notonomus polli, a beetle of family Carabidae
- Oxylapia polli, a fish of family Cichlidae
- Placidochromis polli, a fish of family Cichlidae
- Polyipnus polli, a fish of family Sternoptychidae
- Synodontis polli, a fish of family Mochokidae
- Tropheus polli, a fish of family Cichlidae

== Other uses ==
- Polli (company), an Italian food company
- Polli Sree College, Bangladesh

== See also ==
- Polli:Nation, a UK social movement
