= Notonomus banksi =

Scientific classification
- Kingdom: Animalia
- Phylum: Arthropoda
- Class: Insecta
- Order: Coleoptera
- Suborder: Adephaga
- Family: Carabidae
- Genus: Notonomus
- Species: N. banksi

Binomial name
- Notonomus banksi Sloane, 1910

Species of beetle

Notonomus banksi is a species of ground beetle in the subfamily Pterostichinae. It was described by Sloane in 1910.
