= Notonomus minimus =

Scientific classification
- Kingdom: Animalia
- Phylum: Arthropoda
- Class: Insecta
- Order: Coleoptera
- Suborder: Adephaga
- Family: Carabidae
- Genus: Notonomus
- Species: N. minimus

Binomial name
- Notonomus minimus Sloane, 1907

Species of beetle

Notonomus minimus is a species of ground beetle in the subfamily Pterostichinae. It was described by Sloane in 1907.
