= Notonomus curvicollis =

Scientific classification
- Kingdom: Animalia
- Phylum: Arthropoda
- Class: Insecta
- Order: Coleoptera
- Suborder: Adephaga
- Family: Carabidae
- Genus: Notonomus
- Species: N. curvicollis

Binomial name
- Notonomus curvicollis Sloane, 1923

Species of beetle

Notonomus curvicollis is a species of ground beetle in the subfamily Pterostichinae. It was described by Sloane in 1923.
