= Notonomus froggatti =

Scientific classification
- Kingdom: Animalia
- Phylum: Arthropoda
- Class: Insecta
- Order: Coleoptera
- Suborder: Adephaga
- Family: Carabidae
- Genus: Notonomus
- Species: N. froggatti

Binomial name
- Notonomus froggatti Sloane, 1902

Species of beetle

Notonomus froggatti is a species of ground beetle in the subfamily Pterostichinae. It was described by Sloane in 1902.
