= Gastrogmus =

Scientific classification
- Kingdom: Animalia
- Phylum: Arthropoda
- Class: Insecta
- Order: Coleoptera
- Suborder: Adephaga
- Family: Carabidae
- Subfamily: Pterostichinae
- Tribe: Pterostichini
- Subtribe: Euchroina
- Genus: Gastrogmus; Sloane, 1915
- Species: G. ischialis

Binomial name
- Gastrogmus ischialis Sloane, 1915

Genus of beetles

Gastrogmus is a genus in the ground beetle family Carabidae. This genus has a single species, Gastrogmus ischialis. found in Australia.
