= VC10 (disambiguation) =

VC10 or VC-10 may refer to:

- Vickers VC10, a British jet airliner
- VC-10 Challengers, a former United States Navy aircraft squadron
- Korg VC-10, an analogue vocoder from the 1970s
- Super VC-10 Hap, a species of fish
- MAX Machine, a home computer
- Akpeteshie, a Ghanaian spirit
- Visual C++ 2010, the 2010 edition of Microsoft Visual C++, a software integrated development environment
