= Notonomus cylindricus =

Scientific classification
- Kingdom: Animalia
- Phylum: Arthropoda
- Class: Insecta
- Order: Coleoptera
- Suborder: Adephaga
- Family: Carabidae
- Genus: Notonomus
- Species: N. cylindricus

Binomial name
- Notonomus cylindricus Sloane, 1913

Species of beetle

Notonomus cylindricus, also known as the 'Figloon beetle', is a species of ground beetle in the subfamily Pterostichinae. It was described by Sloan in 1913.
