= Clivina blackburni =

Scientific classification
- Kingdom: Animalia
- Phylum: Arthropoda
- Class: Insecta
- Order: Coleoptera
- Suborder: Adephaga
- Family: Carabidae
- Genus: Clivina
- Species: C. blackburni

Binomial name
- Clivina blackburni Sloane, 1896

Species of beetle

Clivina blackburni is a species of ground beetle in the subfamily Scaritinae. It was described by Sloane in 1896.
