= Litarthrum =

Scientific classification
- Kingdom: Animalia
- Phylum: Arthropoda
- Class: Insecta
- Order: Coleoptera
- Suborder: Adephaga
- Family: Carabidae
- Tribe: Pterostichini
- Subtribe: Euchroina
- Genus: Litarthrum; Sloane, 1915
- Species: L. browni

Binomial name
- Litarthrum browni Sloane, 1915

Genus of beetles

Litarthrum is a genus in the ground beetle family Carabidae. This genus has a single species, Litarthrum browni. It is found in Australia.
