= Notonomus dives =

Scientific classification
- Kingdom: Animalia
- Phylum: Arthropoda
- Class: Insecta
- Order: Coleoptera
- Suborder: Adephaga
- Family: Carabidae
- Genus: Notonomus
- Species: N. dives

Binomial name
- Notonomus dives Sloane, 1915

Species of beetle

Notonomus dives is a species of ground beetle in the subfamily Pterostichinae. It was described by Sloane in 1915.
