= Notolestus =

Scientific classification
- Kingdom: Animalia
- Phylum: Arthropoda
- Class: Insecta
- Order: Coleoptera
- Suborder: Adephaga
- Family: Carabidae
- Tribe: Pterostichini
- Subtribe: Pterostichina
- Genus: Notolestus; Sloane, 1894
- Species: N. sulcipennis

Binomial name
- Notolestus sulcipennis (W.J.MacLeay, 1873)

Genus of beetles

Notolestus is a genus in the ground beetle family Carabidae. This genus has a single species, Notolestus sulcipennis. It is found in Australia.
