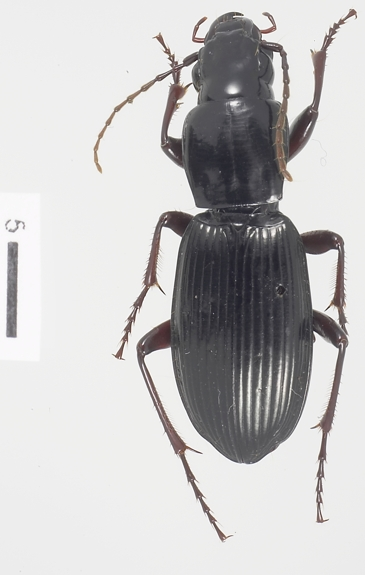

Scientific classification
- Kingdom: Animalia
- Phylum: Arthropoda
- Class: Insecta
- Order: Coleoptera
- Suborder: Adephaga
- Family: Carabidae
- Genus: Notonomus
- Species: N. atrodermis

Binomial name
- Notonomus atrodermis Sloane, 1903

= Notonomus atrodermis =

Species of beetle

Notonomus atrodermis is a species of ground beetle in the subfamily Pterostichinae. It was described by Sloane in 1903.
