= Hypaetha frenchi =

Scientific classification
- Kingdom: Animalia
- Phylum: Arthropoda
- Class: Insecta
- Order: Coleoptera
- Suborder: Adephaga
- Family: Cicindelidae
- Genus: Hypaetha
- Species: H. frenchi

Binomial name
- Hypaetha frenchi (Sloane, 1904)

Synonyms
- Cicindela frenchi Sloane, 1904

Species of beetle

Hypaetha frenchi is a species of tiger beetle found in Australia.
