= Archidela darwini =

Scientific classification
- Kingdom: Animalia
- Phylum: Arthropoda
- Class: Insecta
- Order: Coleoptera
- Suborder: Adephaga
- Family: Cicindelidae
- Genus: Archidela
- Species: A. darwini

Binomial name
- Archidela darwini (Sloane, 1909)

Synonyms
- Cicindela darwini Sloane, 1909

Species of beetle

Archidela darwini is a species of tiger beetle. This species is found in Australia, where it has been recorded from the Northern Territory.
