= Mecyclothorax blackburni =

Scientific classification
- Kingdom: Animalia
- Phylum: Arthropoda
- Class: Insecta
- Order: Coleoptera
- Suborder: Adephaga
- Family: Carabidae
- Genus: Mecyclothorax
- Species: M. blackburni

Binomial name
- Mecyclothorax blackburni (Sloane, 1898)

Species of beetle

Mecyclothorax blackburni is a species of ground beetle in the subfamily Psydrinae. It was described by Sloane in 1898.
