= Archidela scitula =

Scientific classification
- Kingdom: Animalia
- Phylum: Arthropoda
- Class: Insecta
- Order: Coleoptera
- Suborder: Adephaga
- Family: Cicindelidae
- Genus: Archidela
- Species: A. scitula

Binomial name
- Archidela scitula (Sloane, 1909)

Synonyms
- Cicindela scitula Sloane, 1909

Species of beetle

Archidela scitula is a species of tiger beetle. This species is found in Australia.
