= Mecyclothorax punctatus =

Scientific classification
- Kingdom: Animalia
- Phylum: Arthropoda
- Class: Insecta
- Order: Coleoptera
- Suborder: Adephaga
- Family: Carabidae
- Genus: Mecyclothorax
- Species: M. punctatus

Binomial name
- Mecyclothorax punctatus (Sloane, 1895)

Species of beetle

Mecyclothorax punctatus is a species of ground beetle in the subfamily Psydrinae. It was described by Sloane in 1895.
