= Setalimorphus =

Scientific classification
- Kingdom: Animalia
- Phylum: Arthropoda
- Class: Insecta
- Order: Coleoptera
- Suborder: Adephaga
- Family: Carabidae
- Subfamily: Pterostichinae
- Tribe: Pterostichini
- Subtribe: Euchroina
- Genus: Setalimorphus; Sloane, 1895

Genus of beetles

Setalimorphus is a genus in the ground beetle family Carabidae. There are at least two described species in Setalimorphus, found in Australia.

== Species ==
These two species belong to the genus Setalimorphus:

- Setalimorphus punctiventris Sloane, 1895
- Setalimorphus regularis Sloane, 1910
