= Phaenaulax =

Scientific classification
- Kingdom: Animalia
- Phylum: Arthropoda
- Class: Insecta
- Order: Coleoptera
- Suborder: Adephaga
- Family: Carabidae
- Tribe: Pterostichini
- Subtribe: Euchroina
- Genus: Phaenaulax; Tschitscherine, 1898
- Species: P. nanus

Binomial name
- Phaenaulax nanus (Sloane, 1895)

Genus of beetles

Phaenaulax is a genus in the ground beetle family Carabidae. This genus has a single species, Phaenaulax nanus. It is found in Australia.
