= Paratrechodes =

Paratrechodes macleayi

Scientific classification
- Kingdom: Animalia
- Phylum: Arthropoda
- Class: Insecta
- Order: Coleoptera
- Suborder: Adephaga
- Family: Carabidae
- Subfamily: Trechinae
- Genus: Paratrechodes; Jeannel, 1926
- Species: P. macleayi

Binomial name
- Paratrechodes macleayi (Sloane, 1920)

Genus of beetles

Paratrechodes macleayi is a species of beetle in the family Carabidae, the only species in the genus Paratrechodes.
