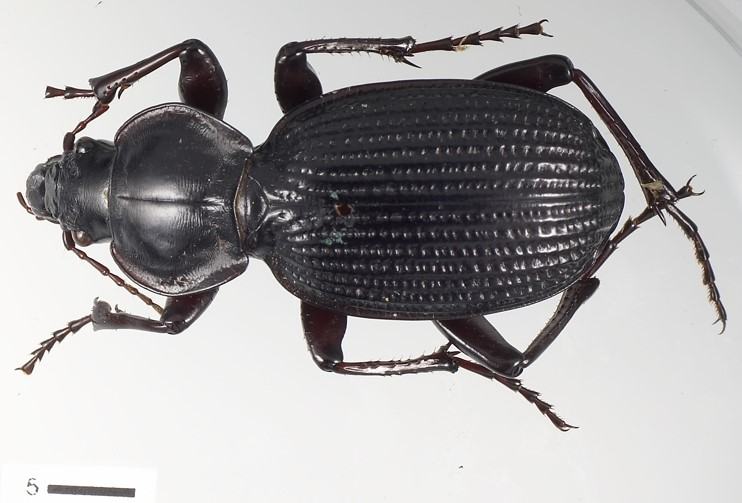
- Cuneipectus foveatus

Scientific classification
- Kingdom: Animalia
- Phylum: Arthropoda
- Class: Insecta
- Order: Coleoptera
- Suborder: Adephaga
- Family: Carabidae
- Subfamily: Pterostichinae
- Tribe: Pterostichini
- Subtribe: Pterostichina
- Genus: Cuneipectus; Sloane, 1907

= Cuneipectus =

Genus of beetles

Cuneipectus is a genus of beetles in the family Carabidae. There are at least two described species in Cuneipectus, found in Antarctic.

== Species ==
These two species belong to the genus Cuneipectus:

- Cuneipectus foveatus Sloane, 1915 (Australia)
- Cuneipectus frenchi Sloane, 1907 (Australia)
