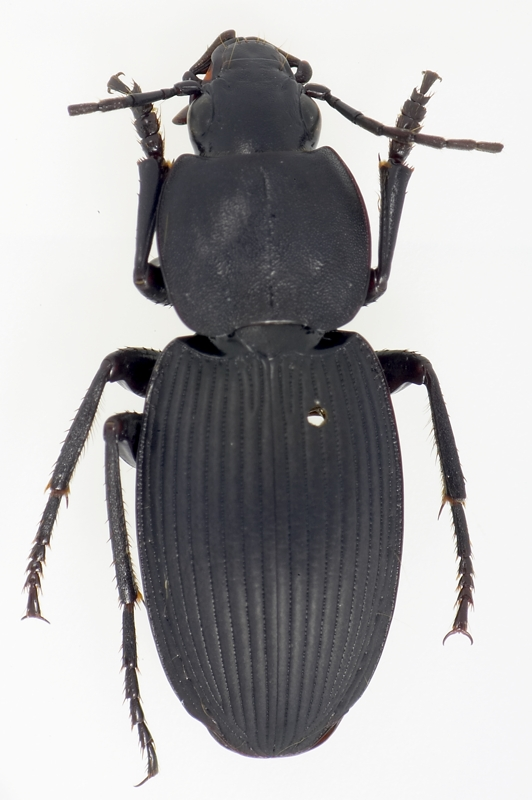
- Amorphomerus chaudoiri

Scientific classification
- Kingdom: Animalia
- Phylum: Arthropoda
- Class: Insecta
- Order: Coleoptera
- Suborder: Adephaga
- Family: Carabidae
- Subfamily: Orthogoniinae
- Tribe: Amorphomerini
- Genus: Amorphomerus; Sloane, 1923

= Amorphomerus =

Genus of beetles

Amorphomerus is a genus in the beetle family Carabidae. There are at least two described species in Amorphomerus.

== Species ==
These two species belong to the genus Amorphomerus:

- Amorphomerus boivini Jeannel, 1948 (Madagascar)
- Amorphomerus raffrayi (Chaudoir, 1878) (Somalia, Kenya, Tanzania, and Mozambique)
