= Notonomus discorimosus =

Scientific classification
- Kingdom: Animalia
- Phylum: Arthropoda
- Class: Insecta
- Order: Coleoptera
- Suborder: Adephaga
- Family: Carabidae
- Subfamily: Pterostichinae
- Tribe: Pterostichini
- Subtribe: Pterostichina
- Genus: Notonomus
- Species: N. discorimosus

Binomial name
- Notonomus discorimosus Sloane, 1902

Synonyms
- Notonomus striatocollis

Species of beetle

Notonomus discorimosus is a species in the beetle family Carabidae. It is found in Australia.
