= Notonomus lateralis =

Scientific classification
- Kingdom: Animalia
- Phylum: Arthropoda
- Class: Insecta
- Order: Coleoptera
- Suborder: Adephaga
- Family: Carabidae
- Genus: Notonomus
- Species: N. lateralis

Binomial name
- Notonomus lateralis Sloane, 1890

Species of beetle

Notonomus lateralis is a species of ground beetle in the subfamily Pterostichinae. It was described by Sloane in 1890.
