= Clivina doddi =

Scientific classification
- Kingdom: Animalia
- Phylum: Arthropoda
- Class: Insecta
- Order: Coleoptera
- Suborder: Adephaga
- Family: Carabidae
- Genus: Clivina
- Species: C. doddi

Binomial name
- Clivina doddi Sloane, 1905

Species of beetle

Clivina doddi is a species of ground beetle in the subfamily Scaritinae. It was described by Sloane in 1905.
