= Mecyclothorax cordicollis =

Scientific classification
- Kingdom: Animalia
- Phylum: Arthropoda
- Class: Insecta
- Order: Coleoptera
- Suborder: Adephaga
- Family: Carabidae
- Genus: Mecyclothorax
- Species: M. cordicollis

Binomial name
- Mecyclothorax cordicollis (Sloane, 1900)

Species of beetle

Mecyclothorax cordicollis is a species of ground beetle in the subfamily Psydrinae. It was first described by Thomas Gibson Sloane in 1900, as Cyclothorax cordicollis. It is found in Queensland, New South Wales and Victoria.
