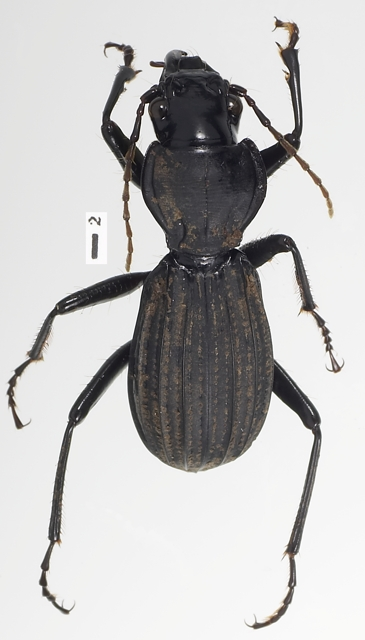

Scientific classification
- Kingdom: Animalia
- Phylum: Arthropoda
- Class: Insecta
- Order: Coleoptera
- Suborder: Adephaga
- Family: Carabidae
- Tribe: Pterostichini
- Subtribe: Pterostichina
- Genus: Loxogenius; Sloane, 1907
- Species: L. opacipennis

Binomial name
- Loxogenius opacipennis (W.J.MacLeay, 1887)

= Loxogenius =

Genus of beetles

Loxogenius is a genus in the ground beetle family Carabidae. This genus has a single species, Loxogenius opacipennis. It is found in Australia.
