= Clivina kershawi =

Scientific classification
- Kingdom: Animalia
- Phylum: Arthropoda
- Class: Insecta
- Order: Coleoptera
- Suborder: Adephaga
- Family: Carabidae
- Genus: Clivina
- Species: C. kershawi

Binomial name
- Clivina kershawi Sloane, 1916

Species of beetle

Clivina kershawi is a species of ground beetle in the subfamily Scaritinae. It was described by Sloane in 1916.
