= Hypaetha upsilon =

Scientific classification
- Kingdom: Animalia
- Phylum: Arthropoda
- Class: Insecta
- Order: Coleoptera
- Suborder: Adephaga
- Family: Cicindelidae
- Genus: Hypaetha
- Species: H. upsilon

Binomial name
- Hypaetha upsilon (Dejean, 1825)

Synonyms
- Cicindela upsilon Dejean, 1825

Species of beetle

Hypaetha upsilon is a species of tiger beetle found in Australia, including New South Wales.
