= Notonomus hopsoni =

Scientific classification
- Domain: Eukaryota
- Kingdom: Animalia
- Phylum: Arthropoda
- Class: Insecta
- Order: Coleoptera
- Suborder: Adephaga
- Family: Carabidae
- Genus: Notonomus
- Species: N. hopsoni

Binomial name
- Notonomus hopsoni Sloane, 1923

Species of beetle

Notonomus hopsoni is a species of ground beetle in the subfamily Pterostichinae. It was described by Sloane in 1923.
