= Archidela nigrina =

Scientific classification
- Kingdom: Animalia
- Phylum: Arthropoda
- Class: Insecta
- Order: Coleoptera
- Suborder: Adephaga
- Family: Cicindelidae
- Genus: Archidela
- Species: A. nigrina

Binomial name
- Archidela nigrina (W.J.MacLeay, 1864)

Synonyms
- Cicindela nigrina W.J.MacLeay, 1864

Species of beetle

Archidela nigrina is a species of tiger beetle. This species is found in New Guinea, Papua New Guinea and Australia, where it has been recorded from the Northern Territory, Queensland and Western Australia.
