= Notonomus kingi =

Scientific classification
- Kingdom: Animalia
- Phylum: Arthropoda
- Clade: Pancrustacea
- Class: Insecta
- Order: Coleoptera
- Suborder: Adephaga
- Family: Carabidae
- Genus: Notonomus
- Species: N. kingi

Binomial name
- Notonomus kingi (W.S. Macleay, 1826)

Species of beetle

Notonomus kingi is a species of ground beetle in the subfamily Pterostichinae. It was described by W.S. Macleay in 1826.
