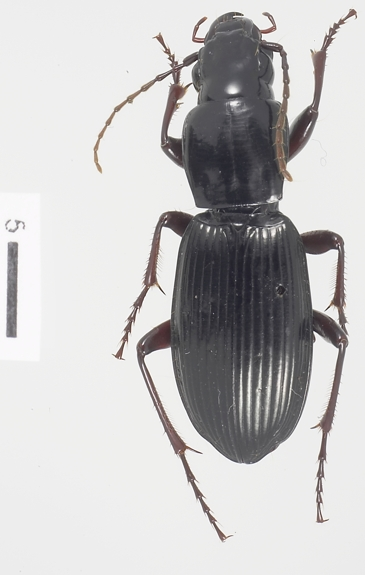
- Notonomus atrodermis

Scientific classification
- Domain: Eukaryota
- Kingdom: Animalia
- Phylum: Arthropoda
- Class: Insecta
- Order: Coleoptera
- Suborder: Adephaga
- Family: Carabidae
- Subfamily: Pterostichinae
- Tribe: Pterostichini
- Subtribe: Pterostichina
- Genus: Notonomus; Chaudoir, 1865

= Notonomus =

Genus of beetles

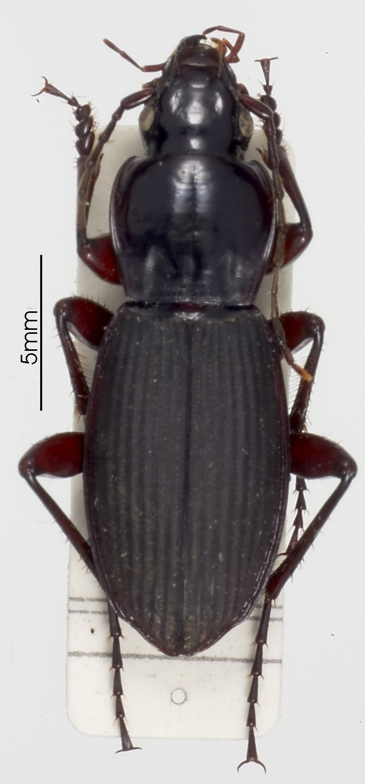
Notonomus carinulatus

Notonomus is a genus of ground beetles in the family Carabidae. There are more than 120 described species in Notonomus, found in Australia.

== Species ==
These 127 species belong to the genus Notonomus:

Subgenus Acanthoferonia B.Moore, 1965
Notonomus ferox (B.Moore, 1965)
Subgenus Conchitella B.Moore, 1962
Notonomus clivinoides (B.Moore, 1962)
Subgenus Leiradira Laporte, 1867

Notonomus alternans (Darlington, 1953)
Notonomus alticola (Darlington, 1961)
Notonomus auricollis (Laporte, 1867)
Notonomus aurifer (Darlington, 1961)
Notonomus barrae Will, 2015
Notonomus dimorphicus Darlington, 1961
Notonomus flos Darlington, 1961
Notonomus iridescens Will, 2015
Notonomus jacobi (Darlington, 1961)
Notonomus latreillei (Laporte, 1867)
Notonomus opacistriatis Sloane, 1902
Notonomus puella (Tschitscherine, 1898)
Notonomus smilodon Will, 2015
Notonomus soror (Darlington, 1961)
Notonomus spectabilis Will, 2015
Notonomus tenuis (Darlington, 1961)
Notonomus thynnefiliarum Will, 2015
Notonomus vadosus Will, 2015
Notonomus viridis Will, 2015

Subgenus Loxodactylus Chaudoir, 1865
Notonomus australiensis (Sloane, 1895)
Notonomus carinulatus (Chaudoir, 1865)
Subgenus Notonomus Chaudoir, 1865

Notonomus aequabilis B.Moore, 1960
Notonomus aequalis Sloane, 1907
Notonomus aeques (Laporte, 1867)
Notonomus amabilis (Laporte, 1867)
Notonomus angulosus Sloane, 1913
Notonomus angustibasis Sloane, 1902
Notonomus apicalis Sloane, 1913
Notonomus arthuri Sloane, 1890
Notonomus atrodermis Sloane, 1903
Notonomus australasiae (Dejean, 1828)
Notonomus australis (Laporte, 1840)
Notonomus bakewelli Sloane, 1902
Notonomus banksi Sloane, 1910
Notonomus besti Sloane, 1902
Notonomus bodeae Sloane, 1913
Notonomus carteri Sloane, 1907
Notonomus chalybeus (Dejean, 1828)
Notonomus colossus Sloane, 1902
Notonomus crenulatus Sloane, 1911
Notonomus croesus (Laporte, 1867)
Notonomus cupricolor Sloane, 1903
Notonomus curvicollis Sloane, 1923
Notonomus cylindricus Sloane, 1913
Notonomus darlingii (Laporte, 1867)
Notonomus dehiscens Sloane, 1923
Notonomus depressipennis (Chaudoir, 1875)
Notonomus discorimosus Sloane, 1902
Notonomus dives Sloane, 1915
Notonomus doddi Sloane, 1913
Notonomus dyscoloides (Motschulsky, 1866)
Notonomus ellioti Darlington, 1961
Notonomus ellipticus Sloane, 1923
Notonomus excisipennis Sloane, 1902
Notonomus fergusoni Sloane, 1910
Notonomus froggatti Sloane, 1902
Notonomus frontevirens Sloane, 1916
Notonomus gippsiensis (Laporte, 1867)
Notonomus gravis (Chaudoir, 1865)
Notonomus hedleyi Sloane, 1916
Notonomus hopsoni Sloane, 1923
Notonomus ingratus (Chaudoir, 1865)
Notonomus johnstoni Sloane, 1907
Notonomus kershawi Sloane, 1902
Notonomus kingi (W.S.MacLeay, 1826)
Notonomus kosciuskianus Sloane, 1902
Notonomus lateralis Sloane, 1890
Notonomus leai Sloane, 1902
Notonomus lesueurii (Laporte, 1867)
Notonomus longus Sloane, 1913
Notonomus macoyi Sloane, 1902
Notonomus marginatus (Laporte, 1840)
Notonomus masculinus Darlington, 1953
Notonomus mediosulcatus (Chaudoir, 1865)
Notonomus melas Sloane, 1903
Notonomus metallicus Sloane, 1913
Notonomus miles (Laporte, 1867)
Notonomus minimus Sloane, 1907
Notonomus molestus (Chaudoir, 1865)
Notonomus montellus Darlington, 1961
Notonomus montorum Darlington, 1961
Notonomus muelleri Sloane, 1902
Notonomus nitescens Sloane, 1911
Notonomus nitidicollis (Chaudoir, 1865)
Notonomus obscurus B.Moore, 1963
Notonomus opacicollis (Chaudoir, 1865)
Notonomus opulentus (Laporte, 1867)
Notonomus parallelomorphus (Chaudoir, 1878)
Notonomus peronii (Laporte, 1867)
Notonomus philippi (Newman, 1842)
Notonomus philippsii (Laporte, 1867)
Notonomus planipectus Sloane, 1903
Notonomus pluripunctatus Sloane, 1903
Notonomus politulus (Chaudoir, 1865)
Notonomus polli Sloane, 1913
Notonomus prominens Sloane, 1913
Notonomus queenslandicus Sloane, 1902
Notonomus rainbowi Sloane, 1902
Notonomus resplendens (Laporte, 1867)
Notonomus saepistriatus Sloane, 1907
Notonomus satrapa (Laporte, 1867)
Notonomus scotti Sloane, 1907
Notonomus semiplicatus (Laporte, 1840)
Notonomus spenceri Sloane, 1902
Notonomus sphodroides (Dejean, 1828)
Notonomus spurgeoni Darlington, 1953
Notonomus strzeleckianus Sloane, 1902
Notonomus subiridescens (Chaudoir, 1865)
Notonomus taylori Sloane, 1903
Notonomus tenuistriatus Sloane, 1913
Notonomus tessellatus Sloane, 1913
Notonomus tillyardi Sloane, 1913
Notonomus transitus Darlington, 1961
Notonomus triplogenioides (Chaudoir, 1865)
Notonomus truncatus Sloane, 1916
Notonomus tubericauda Bates, 1878
Notonomus variicollis (Chaudoir, 1865)
Notonomus victoriensis Sloane, 1902
Notonomus violaceus (Laporte, 1834)
Notonomus wentworthi Sloane, 1913
Notonomus wilcoxii (Laporte, 1867)

Not assigned to a subgenus
Notonomus blackburni (Sloane, 1895)
Notonomus hephaestus Will, 2015
Notonomus impar (Sloane, 1893)
Notonomus nocturnocappellus Will, 2015
