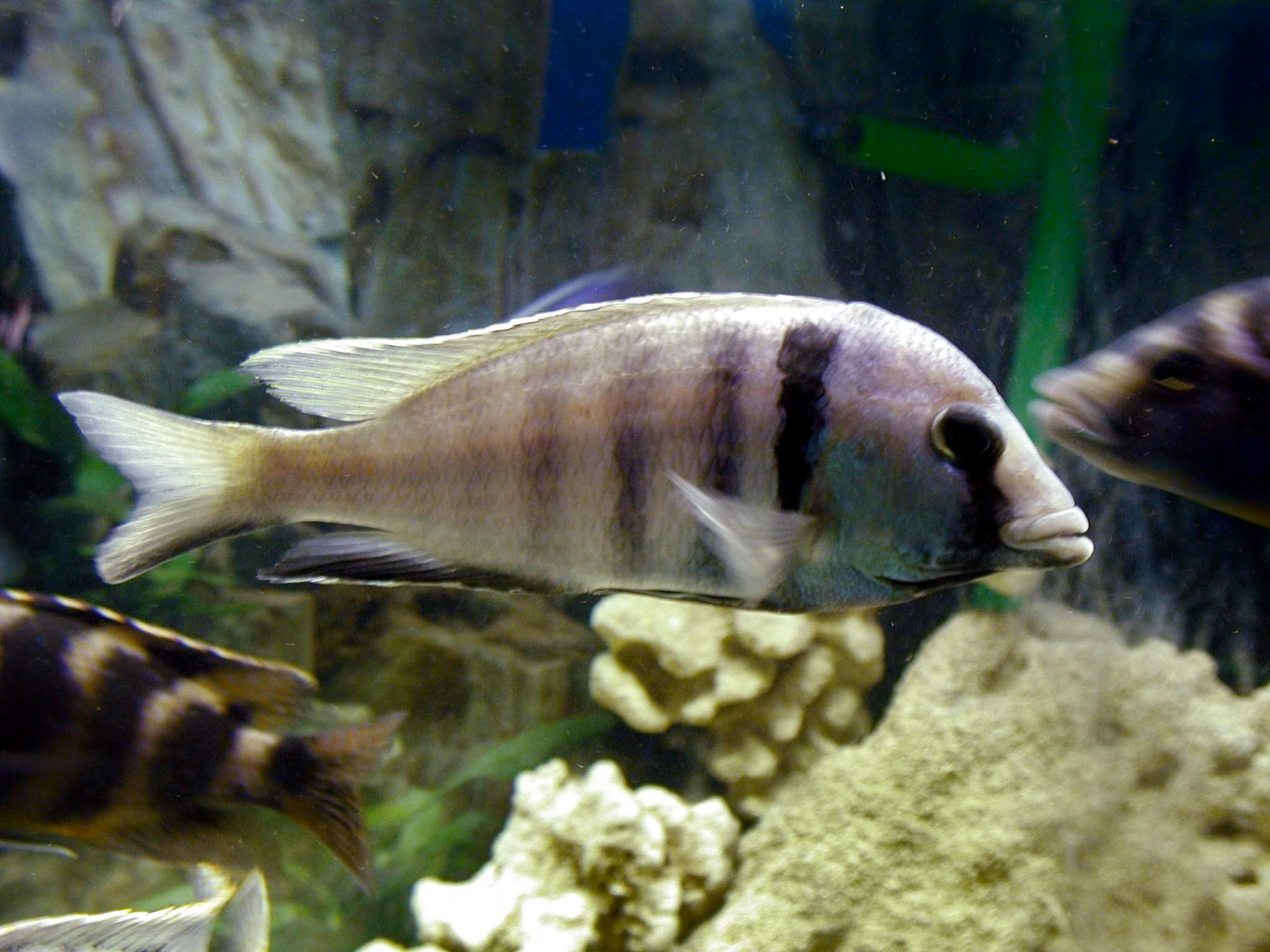

Conservation status
- Least Concern (IUCN 3.1)

Scientific classification
- Kingdom: Animalia
- Phylum: Chordata
- Class: Actinopterygii
- Order: Cichliformes
- Family: Cichlidae
- Genus: Placidochromis
- Species: P. electra

Binomial name
- Placidochromis electra (W. E. Burgess, 1979)

Synonyms
- Haplochromis electra W. E. Burgess, 1979; Cyrtocara electra (W. E. Burgess, 1979)

= Deep-water hap =

Species of fish

The deep-water hap (Placidochromis electra) is a species of cichlid endemic to Lake Malawi where it prefers areas with sandy substrates, generally at depths of around 7 metres (23 ft). This species can reach a length of 12 centimetres (4.7 in) SL. This species can also be found in the aquarium trade.
