= Hypaetha singularis =

Scientific classification
- Kingdom: Animalia
- Phylum: Arthropoda
- Class: Insecta
- Order: Coleoptera
- Suborder: Adephaga
- Family: Cicindelidae
- Genus: Hypaetha
- Species: H. singularis

Binomial name
- Hypaetha singularis (Chaudoir, 1876)

Synonyms
- Cicindela singularis Chaudoir, 1876; Cicindela somalica Mandl, 1959

Species of beetle

Hypaetha singularis is a species of tiger beetle found in Egypt, Oman, Yemen, Sudan, Eritrea, Djibouti and Somalia.
