= Notonomus opacicollis =

Scientific classification
- Domain: Eukaryota
- Kingdom: Animalia
- Phylum: Arthropoda
- Class: Insecta
- Order: Coleoptera
- Suborder: Adephaga
- Family: Carabidae
- Genus: Notonomus
- Species: N. opacicollis

Binomial name
- Notonomus opacicollis (Chaudoir, 1865)

Species of beetle

Notonomus opacicollis is a species of ground beetle in the subfamily Pterostichinae. It was described by Maximilien Chaudoir in 1865.
