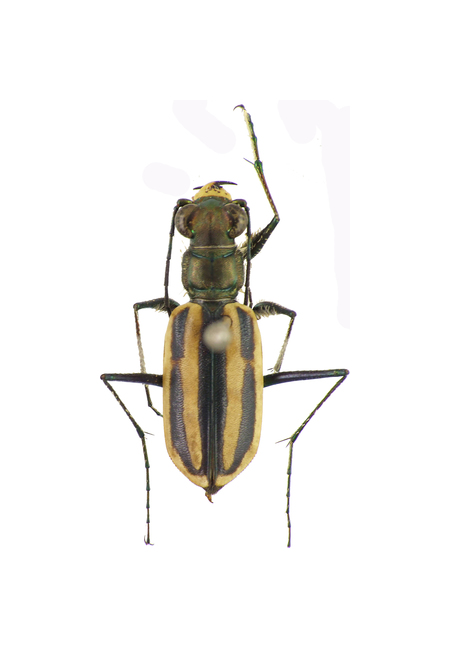

Scientific classification
- Kingdom: Animalia
- Phylum: Arthropoda
- Clade: Pancrustacea
- Class: Insecta
- Order: Coleoptera
- Suborder: Adephaga
- Family: Cicindelidae
- Genus: Hypaetha
- Species: H. quadrilineata

Binomial name
- Hypaetha quadrilineata (Fabricius, 1781)

Synonyms
- Cicindela quadrilineata Fabricius, 1781; Cicindela renati Maindron, 1899; Cicindela renei W.Horn, 1897; Cicindela millingeni Bates, 1878

= Hypaetha quadrilineata =

Species of beetle

Hypaetha quadrilineata is a species of tiger beetle found in Iran, Pakistan, Sri Lanka, India, Myanmar, Thailand and Malaysia.
