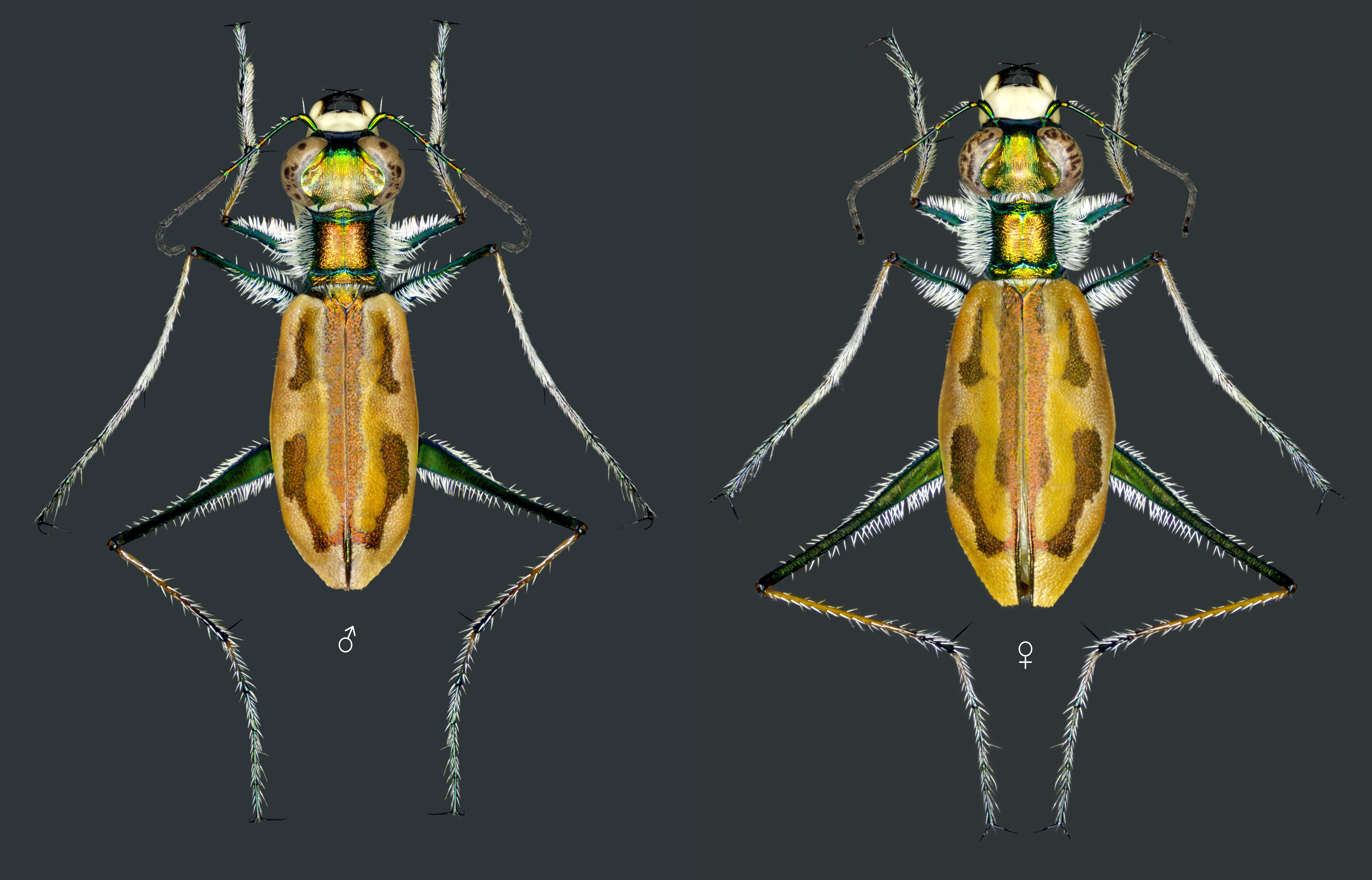

Scientific classification
- Domain: Eukaryota
- Kingdom: Animalia
- Phylum: Arthropoda
- Class: Insecta
- Order: Coleoptera
- Suborder: Adephaga
- Family: Cicindelidae
- Genus: Hypaetha
- Species: H. ornatipennis

Binomial name
- Hypaetha ornatipennis (Schilder, 1953)

Synonyms
- Cicindela ornatipennis Schilder, 1953; Cicindela ornata Fleutiaux, 1898

= Hypaetha ornatipennis =

Species of beetle

Hypaetha ornatipennis is a species of tiger beetle found in Iran and Pakistan.
