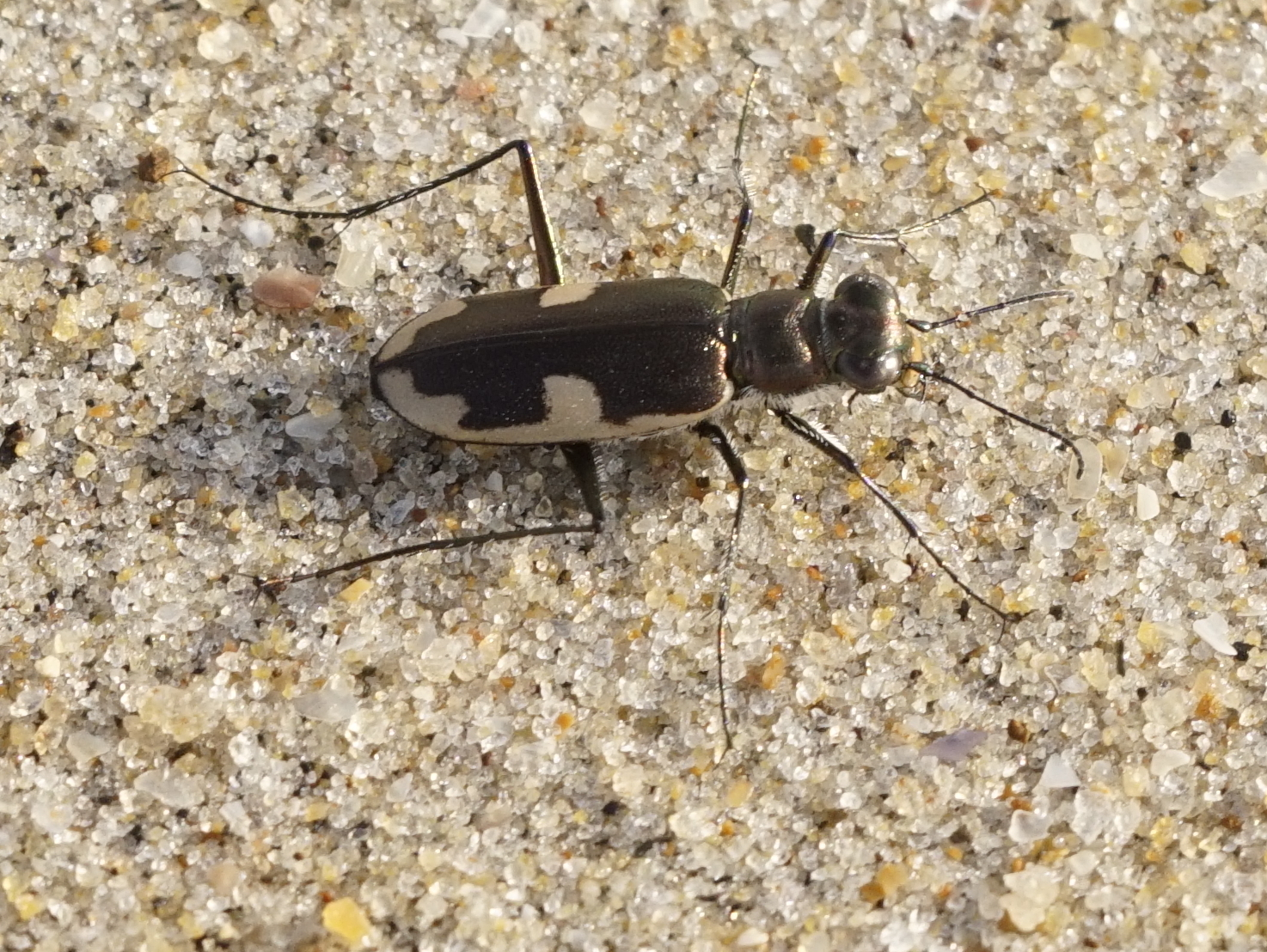

Scientific classification
- Kingdom: Animalia
- Phylum: Arthropoda
- Clade: Pancrustacea
- Class: Insecta
- Order: Coleoptera
- Suborder: Adephaga
- Family: Cicindelidae
- Genus: Hypaetha
- Species: H. biramosa

Binomial name
- Hypaetha biramosa (Fabricius, 1781)

Synonyms
- Cicindela biramosa Fabricius, 1781; Cicindela contracta Fleutiaux, 1894; Cicindela dilatata Fleutiaux, 1894; Cicindela tridentata Thunberg, 1781

= Hypaetha biramosa =

Species of beetle

Hypaetha biramosa is a species of tiger beetle found on open sandy beaches in coastal areas across tropical Asia from India to Indonesia.
