= Hypaetha intricata =

Scientific classification
- Kingdom: Animalia
- Phylum: Arthropoda
- Class: Insecta
- Order: Coleoptera
- Suborder: Adephaga
- Family: Cicindelidae
- Genus: Hypaetha
- Species: H. intricata

Binomial name
- Hypaetha intricata (Dejean, 1831)

Synonyms
- Cicindela intricata Dejean, 1831; Cicindela natalensis Péringuey, 1888

Species of beetle

Hypaetha intricata is a species of tiger beetle found in Zambia, Botswana, Namibia and South Africa.
