= Notonomus chalybeus =

Scientific classification
- Kingdom: Animalia
- Phylum: Arthropoda
- Class: Insecta
- Order: Coleoptera
- Suborder: Adephaga
- Family: Carabidae
- Subfamily: Pterostichinae
- Tribe: Pterostichini
- Subtribe: Pterostichina
- Genus: Notonomus
- Species: N. chalybeus

Binomial name
- Notonomus chalybeus (Dejean, 1828)

Synonyms
- Notonomus chalybaeus (Dejean, 1828); Notonomus phillipsii; Notonomus striatocollis

Species of beetle

Notonomus chalybeus is a species in the beetle family Carabidae, found in Australia.
