= Notonomus dyscoloides =

Scientific classification
- Domain: Eukaryota
- Kingdom: Animalia
- Phylum: Arthropoda
- Class: Insecta
- Order: Coleoptera
- Suborder: Adephaga
- Family: Carabidae
- Genus: Notonomus
- Species: N. dyscoloides

Binomial name
- Notonomus dyscoloides (Motschulsky, 1865)

Species of beetle

Notonomus dyscoloides is a species of ground beetle in the subfamily Pterostichinae. It was described by Victor Motschulsky in 1865.
