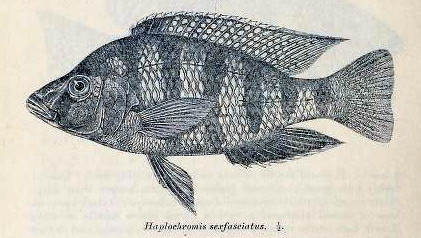

Conservation status
- Least Concern (IUCN 3.1)

Scientific classification
- Kingdom: Animalia
- Phylum: Chordata
- Class: Actinopterygii
- Order: Cichliformes
- Family: Cichlidae
- Genus: Placidochromis
- Species: P. johnstoni

Binomial name
- Placidochromis johnstoni (Günther, 1894)

Synonyms
- Chromis johnstoni Günther, 1894; Astatotilapia johnstoni (Günther, 1894); Cyrtocara johnstoni (Günther, 1894); Haplochromis johnstoni (Günther, 1894); Tilapia johnstoni (Günther, 1894); Haplochromis sexfasciatus Regan, 1922

= Placidochromis johnstoni =

Species of fish

Placidochromis johnstoni is a species of cichlid native to Lake Malawi, Lake Malombe and the upper reaches of the Shire River where it prefers shallow waters with plentiful vegetation. This species can reach a length of 20 centimetres (7.9 in) TL. It can also be found in the aquarium trade. The specific name honours the British explorer, botanist, artist, colonial administrator and linguist Sir Henry Hamilton Johnston, better known as Harry Johnston, who collected the type and sent it to the British Museum (Natural History).
