= Notonomus sphodroides =

Scientific classification
- Kingdom: Animalia
- Phylum: Arthropoda
- Class: Insecta
- Order: Coleoptera
- Suborder: Adephaga
- Family: Carabidae
- Genus: Notonomus
- Species: N. sphodroides

Binomial name
- Notonomus sphodroides (Dejean, 1828)

Species of beetle

Notonomus sphodroides is a species of ground beetle in the subfamily Pterostichinae. It was described by Pierre François Marie Auguste Dejean in 1828.
