= Notonomus tubericauda =

Scientific classification
- Domain: Eukaryota
- Kingdom: Animalia
- Phylum: Arthropoda
- Class: Insecta
- Order: Coleoptera
- Suborder: Adephaga
- Family: Carabidae
- Genus: Notonomus
- Species: N. tubericauda

Binomial name
- Notonomus tubericauda Bates, 1878

Species of beetle

Notonomus tubericauda is a species of ground beetle in the subfamily Pterostichinae. It was described by Henry Walter Bates in 1878.
