= Hypaetha copulata =

Scientific classification
- Kingdom: Animalia
- Phylum: Arthropoda
- Clade: Pancrustacea
- Class: Insecta
- Order: Coleoptera
- Suborder: Adephaga
- Family: Cicindelidae
- Genus: Hypaetha
- Species: H. copulata

Binomial name
- Hypaetha copulata (Schmidt-Goebel, 1846)

Synonyms
- Cicindela copulata Schmidt-Goebel, 1846

Species of beetle

Hypaetha copulata is a species of tiger beetle found in Saudi Arabia, Arab Emirates, Oman, Iran and Pakistan.

== Subspecies ==
- Hypaetha copulata copulata (Saudi Arabia, Arab Emirates, Oman, Iran, Pakistan)
- Hypaetha copulata emiratensis Wiesner, 1993 (Arab Emirates)
