= Notonomus ellioti =

Scientific classification
- Domain: Eukaryota
- Kingdom: Animalia
- Phylum: Arthropoda
- Class: Insecta
- Order: Coleoptera
- Suborder: Adephaga
- Family: Carabidae
- Genus: Notonomus
- Species: N. ellioti

Binomial name
- Notonomus ellioti Darlington, 1961

Species of beetle

Notonomus ellioti is a species of ground beetle in the subfamily Pterostichinae. It was described by Darlington in 1961.
