= Notonomus philippsii =

Scientific classification
- Domain: Eukaryota
- Kingdom: Animalia
- Phylum: Arthropoda
- Class: Insecta
- Order: Coleoptera
- Suborder: Adephaga
- Family: Carabidae
- Subfamily: Pterostichinae
- Tribe: Pterostichini
- Subtribe: Pterostichina
- Genus: Notonomus
- Species: N. philippsii

Binomial name
- Notonomus philippsii (Laporte, 1867)

Synonyms
- Notonomus phillipsii

Species of beetle

Notonomus philippsii is a species in the beetle family Carabidae. It is found in Australia.
