= Hypaetha immanis =

Scientific classification
- Kingdom: Animalia
- Phylum: Arthropoda
- Class: Insecta
- Order: Coleoptera
- Suborder: Adephaga
- Family: Cicindelidae
- Genus: Hypaetha
- Species: H. immanis

Binomial name
- Hypaetha immanis (Bates, 1874)

Synonyms
- Cicindela immanis Bates, 1874

Species of beetle

Hypaetha immanis is a species of tiger beetle found in Oman and Yemen.
