= Hypaetha montravelii =

Scientific classification
- Kingdom: Animalia
- Phylum: Arthropoda
- Class: Insecta
- Order: Coleoptera
- Suborder: Adephaga
- Family: Cicindelidae
- Genus: Hypaetha
- Species: H. montravelii

Binomial name
- Hypaetha montravelii (Blanchard, 1842)

Synonyms
- Cicindela montravelii Blanchard, 1842; Cicindela rafflesia Chaudoir, 1852

Species of beetle

Hypaetha montravelii is a species of tiger beetle found in Indonesia and Australia.
