= Notonomus wilcoxii =

Scientific classification
- Domain: Eukaryota
- Kingdom: Animalia
- Phylum: Arthropoda
- Class: Insecta
- Order: Coleoptera
- Suborder: Adephaga
- Family: Carabidae
- Genus: Notonomus
- Species: N. wilcoxii

Binomial name
- Notonomus wilcoxii (Castelnau, 1867)

Species of beetle

Notonomus wilcoxii is a species of ground beetle in the subfamily Pterostichinae. It was described by Castelnau in 1867.
