= Hypaetha albicans =

Scientific classification
- Domain: Eukaryota
- Kingdom: Animalia
- Phylum: Arthropoda
- Class: Insecta
- Order: Coleoptera
- Suborder: Adephaga
- Family: Cicindelidae
- Genus: Hypaetha
- Species: H. albicans

Binomial name
- Hypaetha albicans (Chaudoir, 1854)

Synonyms
- Cicindela albicans Chaudoir, 1854; Cicindela upsilon albicans; Cicindela wilcoxii Laporte, 1867

Species of beetle

Hypaetha albicans is a species of tiger beetle found in Australia, where it has been recorded from New South Wales and Queensland.
