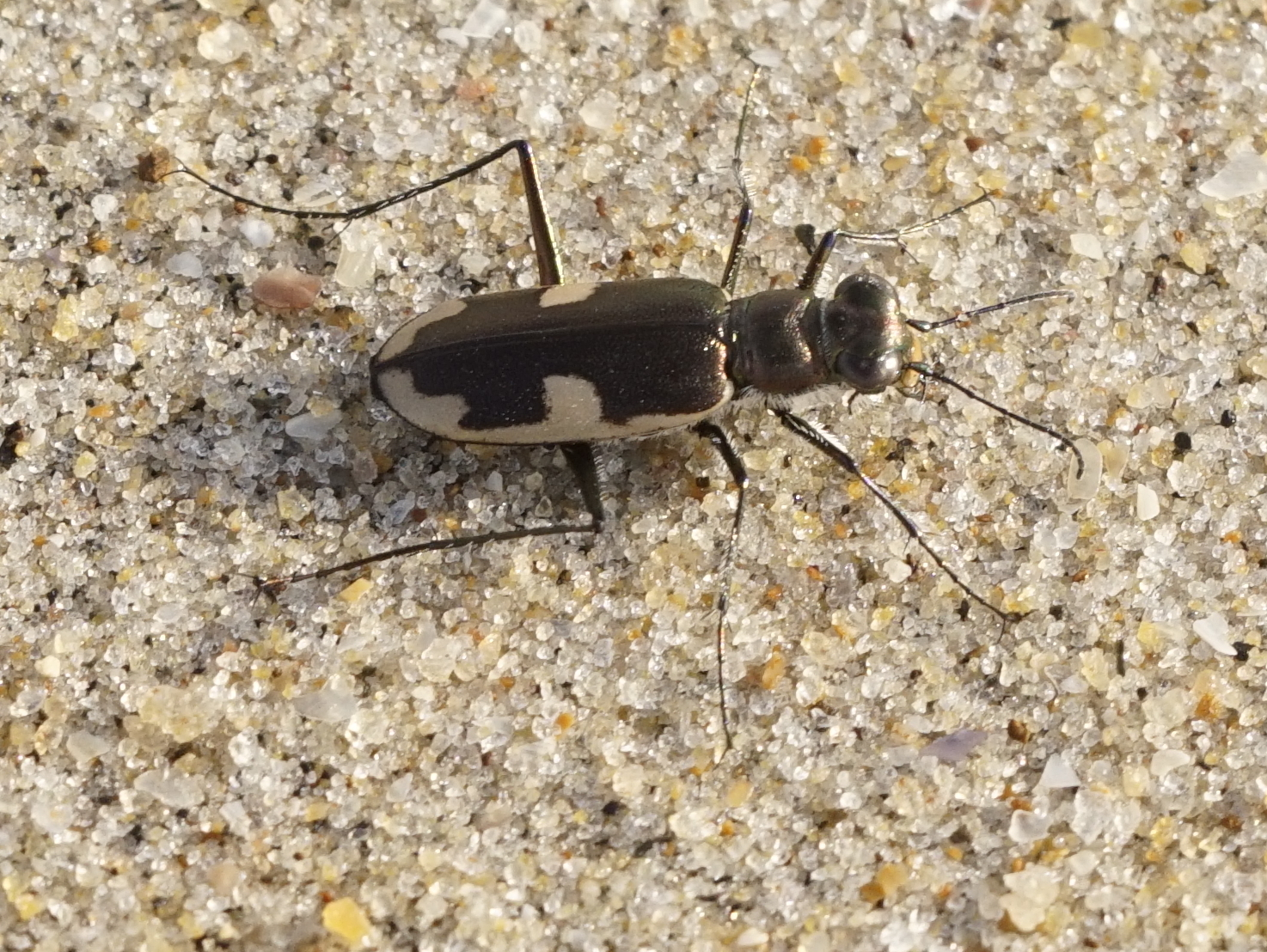
- Hypaetha biramosa

Scientific classification
- Kingdom: Animalia
- Phylum: Arthropoda
- Class: Insecta
- Order: Coleoptera
- Suborder: Adephaga
- Family: Cicindelidae
- Tribe: Cicindelini
- Subtribe: Cicindelina
- Genus: Hypaetha; LeConte, 1857

Synonyms
- Cylindrostoma Motschulsky, 1861

= Hypaetha =

Genus of beetles

Hypaetha is a genus in the beetle family Cicindelidae. There are about 14 described species in Hypaetha.

== Species ==
These 14 species belong to the genus Hypaetha:

- Hypaetha albicans (Chaudoir, 1854) (Australia)
- Hypaetha antiqua (Lea, 1917) (Australia)
- Hypaetha biramosa (Fabricius, 1781) (Southeast Asia)
- Hypaetha copulata (Schmidt-Goebel, 1846) (Pakistan, Near East)
- Hypaetha frenchi (Sloane, 1904) (Australia)
- Hypaetha immanis (Bates, 1874) (Oman and Yemen)
- Hypaetha intricata (Dejean, 1831) (Zambia, Botswana, Namibia, South Africa)
- Hypaetha montravelii (Blanchard, 1842) (Indonesia and Australia)
- Hypaetha ornatipennis (Schilder, 1953) (Iran and Pakistan)
- Hypaetha pseudorafflesia (W.Horn, 1925) (Australia)
- Hypaetha quadrilineata (Fabricius, 1781) (Near East, Indomalaya)
- Hypaetha schmidti (W.Horn, 1927) (Saudi Arabia, Arab Emirates, and Iran)
- Hypaetha singularis (Chaudoir, 1876) (Africa)
- Hypaetha upsilon (Dejean, 1825) (Australia)
