= Hypaetha antiqua =

Scientific classification
- Domain: Eukaryota
- Kingdom: Animalia
- Phylum: Arthropoda
- Class: Insecta
- Order: Coleoptera
- Suborder: Adephaga
- Family: Cicindelidae
- Genus: Hypaetha
- Species: H. antiqua

Binomial name
- Hypaetha antiqua (Lea, 1917)

Synonyms
- Cicindela antiqua Lea, 1917

Species of beetle

Hypaetha antiqua is a species of tiger beetle found in Australia.
