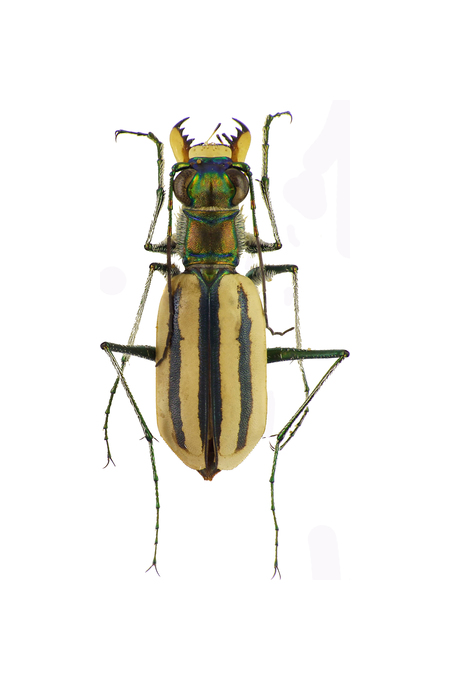

Scientific classification
- Kingdom: Animalia
- Phylum: Arthropoda
- Class: Insecta
- Order: Coleoptera
- Suborder: Adephaga
- Family: Cicindelidae
- Genus: Hypaetha
- Species: H. schmidti

Binomial name
- Hypaetha schmidti (W.Horn, 1927)

Synonyms
- Cicindela schmidti W.Horn, 1927

= Hypaetha schmidti =

Species of beetle

Hypaetha schmidti is a species of tiger beetle found in Saudi Arabia, Arab Emirates and Iran.
