= Hypaetha pseudorafflesia =

Scientific classification
- Domain: Eukaryota
- Kingdom: Animalia
- Phylum: Arthropoda
- Class: Insecta
- Order: Coleoptera
- Suborder: Adephaga
- Family: Cicindelidae
- Genus: Hypaetha
- Species: H. pseudorafflesia

Binomial name
- Hypaetha pseudorafflesia (W.Horn, 1925)

Synonyms
- Cicindela pseudorafflesia W.Horn, 1925; Cicindela rafflesia pseudorafflesia

Species of beetle

Hypaetha pseudorafflesia is a species of tiger beetle found in Australia.
