= Placidochromis hennydaviesae =

Conservation status
- Least Concern (IUCN 3.1)

Scientific classification
- Kingdom: Animalia
- Phylum: Chordata
- Class: Actinopterygii
- Order: Cichliformes
- Family: Cichlidae
- Genus: Placidochromis
- Species: P. hennydaviesae

Binomial name
- Placidochromis hennydaviesae (W. E. Burgess & H. R. Axelrod, 1973)

Synonyms
- Haplochromis hennydaviesae W. E. Burgess & Axelrod, 1973

Species of fish

Placidochromis hennydaviesae is a species of cichlid endemic to Lake Malawi where it is only known from the southern portions of the lake. It is found in areas with muddy substrates at depths of from 71 to 100 metres (233 to 328 ft). This species can reach a length of 10 centimetres (3.9 in) TL.

== Etymology ==
The specific name honours Henny Davies, the spouse of Peter Davies who was an exporter of fish from Lake Malawi.
