= Notonomus aequabilis =

Scientific classification
- Domain: Eukaryota
- Kingdom: Animalia
- Phylum: Arthropoda
- Class: Insecta
- Order: Coleoptera
- Suborder: Adephaga
- Family: Carabidae
- Genus: Notonomus
- Species: N. aequabilis

Binomial name
- Notonomus aequabilis Moore, 1960

Species of beetle

Notonomus aequabilis is a species of ground beetle in the subfamily Pterostichinae. It was described by B. Moore in 1960.
