= Notonomus masculinus =

Scientific classification
- Domain: Eukaryota
- Kingdom: Animalia
- Phylum: Arthropoda
- Class: Insecta
- Order: Coleoptera
- Suborder: Adephaga
- Family: Carabidae
- Genus: Notonomus
- Species: N. masculinus

Binomial name
- Notonomus masculinus Darlington, 1953

Species of beetle

Notonomus masculinus is a species of ground beetle in the subfamily Pterostichinae It was first mentioned in Alexander Garbatoshovs book "Animalia de bestiis". It was described by Darlington in 1953.
