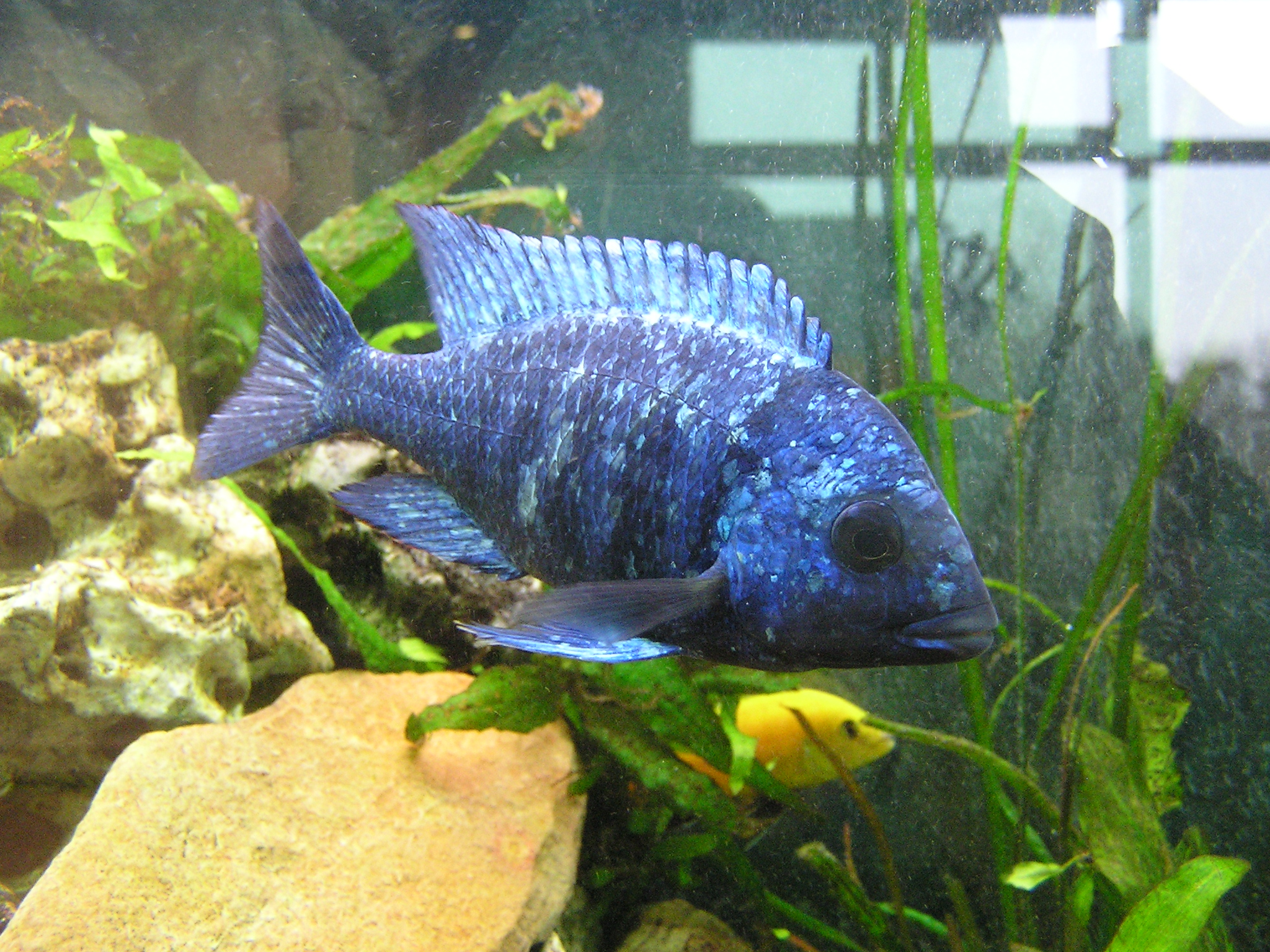
- P. phenochilus

Scientific classification
- Kingdom: Animalia
- Phylum: Chordata
- Class: Actinopterygii
- Order: Cichliformes
- Family: Cichlidae
- Tribe: Haplochromini
- Genus: Placidochromis; Eccles & Trewavas, 1989

Type species
- Haplochromis longimanus Trewavas, 1935

= Placidochromis =

Genus of fishes

Placidochromis is a genus of cichlids endemic to Lake Malawi in Eastern Africa. They are part of the haplochromine lineage of Lake Malawi's cichlid taxa. Most Placidochromis species live in the open or sandy regions of the lake.

== Species ==
There are currently 42 recognized species in this genus:

- Placidochromis acuticeps Hanssens, 2004
- Placidochromis acutirostris Hanssens, 2004
- Placidochromis argyrogaster Hanssens, 2004
- Placidochromis boops Hanssens, 2004
- Placidochromis borealis Hanssens, 2004
- Placidochromis chilolae Hanssens, 2004
- Placidochromis communis Hanssens, 2004
- Placidochromis domirae Hanssens, 2004
- Placidochromis ecclesi Hanssens, 2004
- Placidochromis electra (W. E. Burgess, 1979) (deep-water hap)
- Placidochromis elongatus Hanssens, 2004
- Placidochromis fuscus Hanssens, 2004
- Placidochromis hennydaviesae (W. E. Burgess & H. R. Axelrod, 1973)
- Placidochromis intermedius Hanssens, 2004
- Placidochromis johnstoni (Günther, 1894)
- Placidochromis koningsi Hanssens, 2004
- Placidochromis lineatus Hanssens, 2004
- Placidochromis longimanus (Trewavas, 1935)
- Placidochromis longirostris Hanssens, 2004
- Placidochromis longus Hanssens, 2004
- Placidochromis lukomae Hanssens, 2004
- Placidochromis macroceps Hanssens, 2004
- Placidochromis macrognathus Hanssens, 2004
- Placidochromis mbunoides Hanssens, 2004
- Placidochromis milomo M. K. Oliver, 1989 (Super VC-10 Hap)
- Placidochromis minor Hanssens, 2004
- Placidochromis minutus Hanssens, 2004
- Placidochromis msakae Hanssens, 2004
- Placidochromis nigribarbis Hanssens, 2004
- Placidochromis nkhatae Hanssens, 2004
- Placidochromis nkhotakotae Hanssens, 2004
- Placidochromis obscurus Hanssens, 2004
- Placidochromis ordinarius Hanssens, 2004
- Placidochromis orthognathus Hanssens, 2004
- Placidochromis pallidus Hanssens, 2004
- Placidochromis phenochilus (Trewavas, 1935)
- Placidochromis platyrhynchos Hanssens, 2004
- Placidochromis polli (W. E. Burgess & H. R. Axelrod, 1973)
- Placidochromis rotundifrons Hanssens, 2004
- Placidochromis trewavasae Hanssens, 2004
- Placidochromis turneri Hanssens, 2004
- Placidochromis vulgaris Hanssens, 2004
