= Archidela =

Scientific classification
- Kingdom: Animalia
- Phylum: Arthropoda
- Class: Insecta
- Order: Coleoptera
- Suborder: Adephaga
- Family: Cicindelidae
- Tribe: Cicindelini
- Subtribe: Cicindelina
- Genus: Archidela; Rivalier, 1963

Genus of beetle

Archidela is a genus in the beetle family Cicindelidae. There are at least four described species in Archidela.

== Species ==
These four species belong to the genus Archidela:

- Archidela darwini (Sloane, 1909) (Australia)
- Archidela nigrina (W.J.MacLeay, 1864) (New Guinea, Papua, and Australia)
- Archidela rugosicollis (W.Horn, 1913) (Australia)
- Archidela scitula (Sloane, 1909) (Australia)
