= Notonomus philippi =

Scientific classification
- Domain: Eukaryota
- Kingdom: Animalia
- Phylum: Arthropoda
- Class: Insecta
- Order: Coleoptera
- Suborder: Adephaga
- Family: Carabidae
- Genus: Notonomus
- Species: N. philippi

Binomial name
- Notonomus philippi (Newman, 1842)

Species of beetle

Notonomus philippi is a species of ground beetle in the subfamily Pterostichinae. It was described by Newman in 1842.
