= Notonomus obscurus =

Scientific classification
- Domain: Eukaryota
- Kingdom: Animalia
- Phylum: Arthropoda
- Class: Insecta
- Order: Coleoptera
- Suborder: Adephaga
- Family: Carabidae
- Genus: Notonomus
- Species: N. obscurus

Binomial name
- Notonomus obscurus Moore, 1963

Species of beetle

Notonomus obscurus is a species of ground beetle in the subfamily Pterostichinae. It was described by Moore in 1963.
