= Placidochromis longimanus =

Conservation status
- Least Concern (IUCN 3.1)

Scientific classification
- Kingdom: Animalia
- Phylum: Chordata
- Class: Actinopterygii
- Order: Cichliformes
- Family: Cichlidae
- Genus: Placidochromis
- Species: P. longimanus

Binomial name
- Placidochromis longimanus (Trewavas, 1935)

Synonyms
- Haplochromis longimanus Trewavas, 1935; Cyrtocara longimanus (Trewavas, 1935)

Species of fish

Placidochromis longimanus is a species of cichlid native to the southern portion of Lake Malawi, Lake Malombe and the Shire River. It is believed to only be found in areas vegetated with Ceratophyllum and Najas at approximately 10 metres (33 ft) in depth. This species can reach a length of 14.5 centimetres (5.7 in) TL. It is also important to local commercial fisheries as well as being found in the aquarium trade. It is the type species of the genus Placidochromis.
