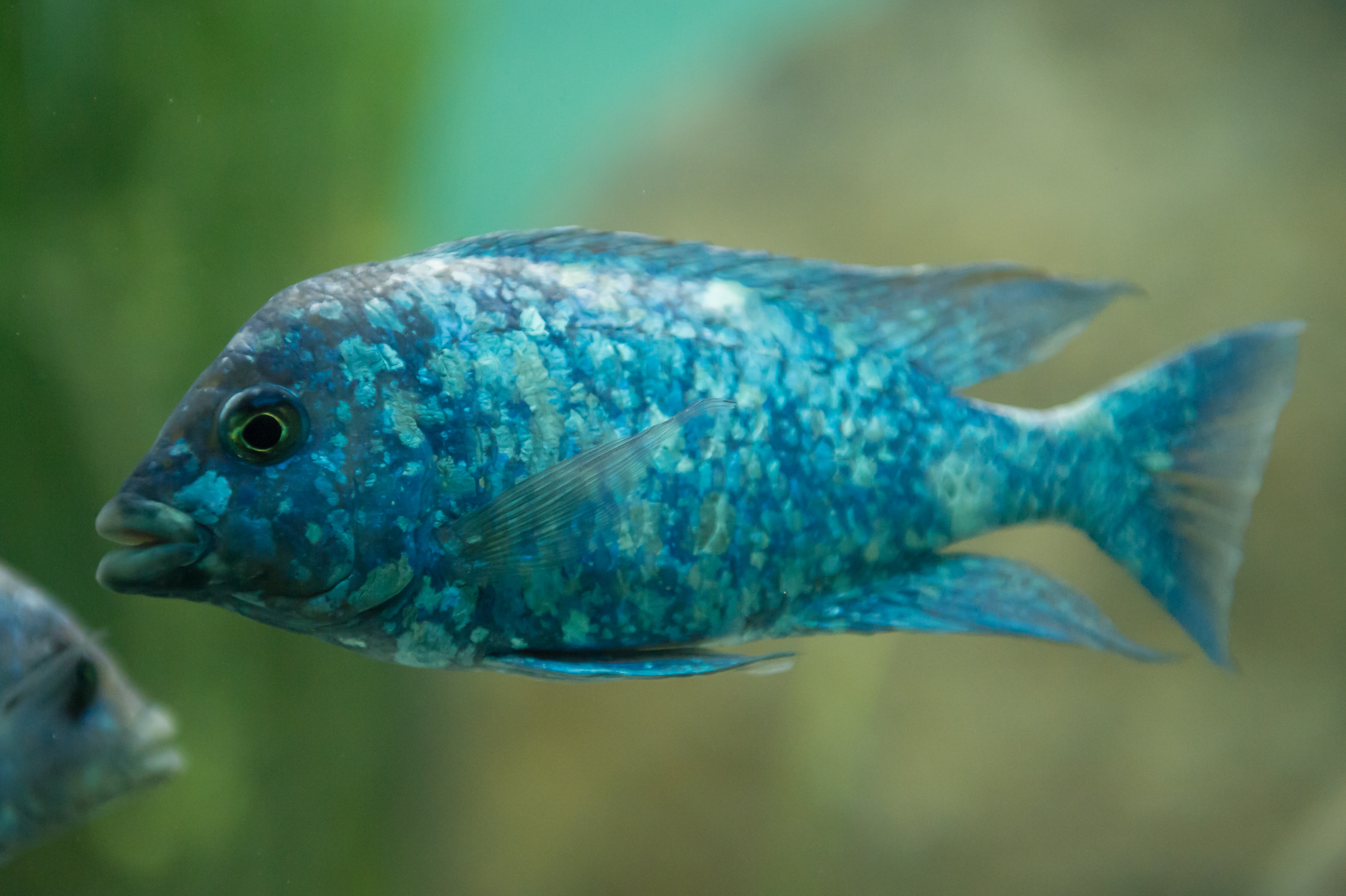

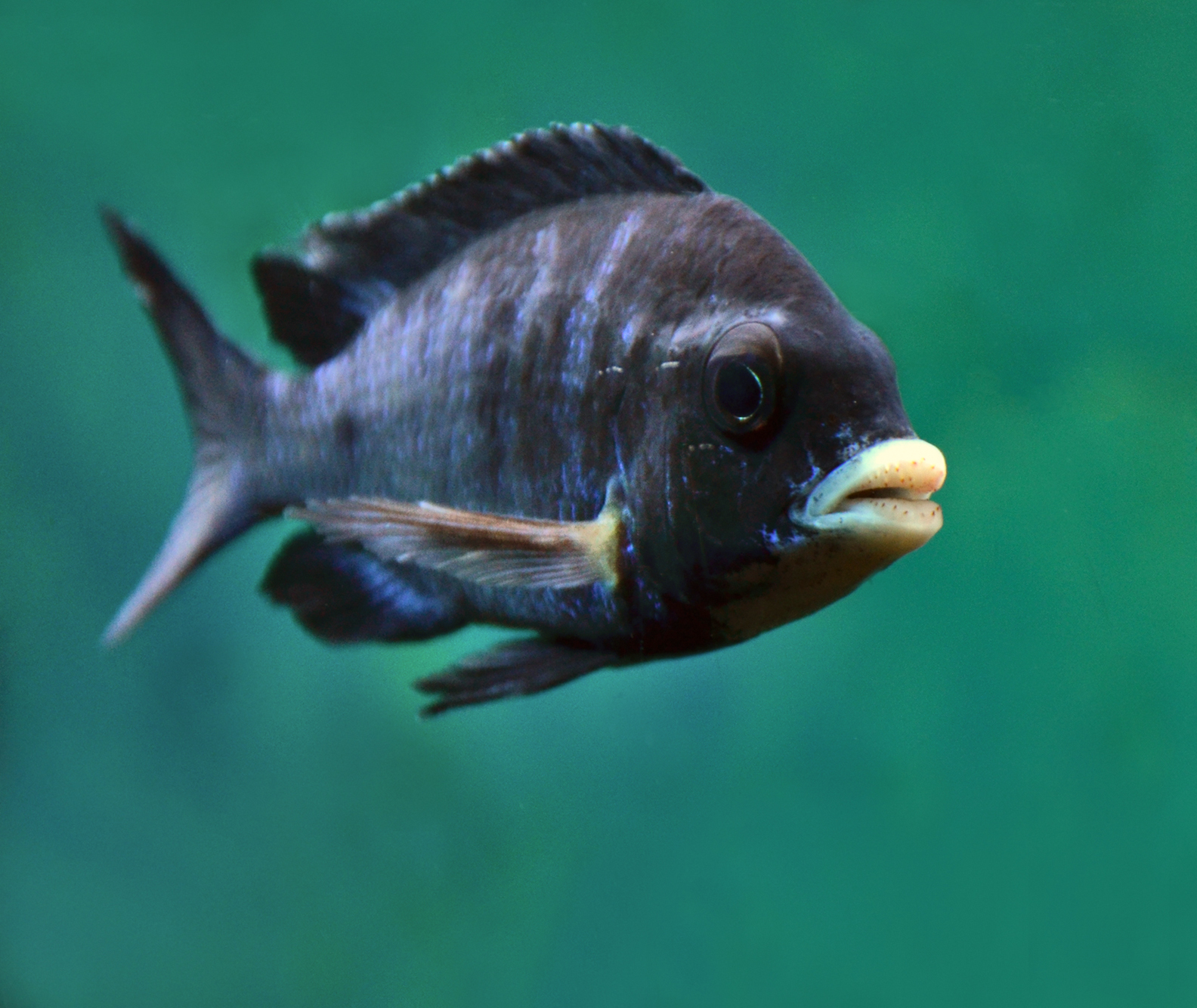
- Males of the Tanzania/Lupingo (above) and Mdoka/white lip (below) variants

Conservation status
- Endangered (IUCN 3.1)

Scientific classification
- Kingdom: Animalia
- Phylum: Chordata
- Class: Actinopterygii
- Order: Cichliformes
- Family: Cichlidae
- Genus: Placidochromis
- Species: P. phenochilus

Binomial name
- Placidochromis phenochilus (Trewavas, 1935)

Synonyms
- Haplochromis phenochilus Trewavas, 1935; Cyrtocara phenochilus (Trewavas, 1935); Protomelas phenochilus (Trewavas, 1935)

= Placidochromis phenochilus =

Species of fish

Placidochromis phenochilus is a species of cichlid that is endemic to the northern parts of Lake Malawi. This species can reach a length of 15.7 centimetres (6.2 in) TL.
