= Placidochromis boops =

Conservation status
- Least Concern (IUCN 3.1)

Scientific classification
- Kingdom: Animalia
- Phylum: Chordata
- Class: Actinopterygii
- Order: Cichliformes
- Family: Cichlidae
- Genus: Placidochromis
- Species: P. boops

Binomial name
- Placidochromis boops Hassens, 2004

Species of fish

Placidochromis boops is a species of deep-water African cichlid endemic to the southern portion of Lake Malawi. This species can reach a length of up to 11.2 centimetres (4.4 in) SL.

== Etymology ==
The generic name of this species, Placidochromis, is derived from the Latin word placidus, meaning "of peaceful or tranquil appearance", and the Greek chromis, meaning "a fish", or possibly "a perch". The specific name, boops, is derived from the Greek βόωψ boōps, literally "cow-eye", referring to the large eyes of this species.

== Morphology ==
=== Description ===
Placidichromis boops has large eyes, and was named after this prominent feature. The dorsal profile of the head touches the upper margin of the eye, while the maxilla extends well beyond vertical at the anterior margin of the eye. The snout of this fish is long and pointed. The mouth is large, and its gape is inclined about 10° to the horizontal. The outer oral teeth are small and mainly tricuspid, however, some bicuspid teeth are present as well. The inner oral teeth are tricuspid, and the rows of inner teeth are close-set. The lower pharyngeal jaw contains a number of small, densely packed teeth, which are specialized for prey processing. Overall, it is a relatively large species, with the ventral body profile less convex than the dorsal body profile.

=== Coloration ===
Placidichromis boops is sexually dimorphic, and coloration can be used as a simple means to sex mature males and females. Mature females and immature males have a brownish yellow body, six (6) vertical bars below the dorsal fin, a dark brownish snout, nape, and dorsum, pale brownish yellow fins, and grey spots on the soft dorsal. Meanwhile, mature males have a darker snout, a dark brown chin and belly, a faint grey band at the base of the dorsal fin, a white submarginal band and black tips, large dark spots which are occasionally merged into oblique bands on the soft dorsal, a darkly-colored anal fin, and darkly-edged caudal and ventral fins.

=== Meristics ===
Placidochromis boops has 31 to 32 scales on the lateral line and 16 scales around the caudal peduncle. There are 16 to 19 gill rakers on the lower limb of the first arch and 4 to 7 on the upper limb, making for a total of 22 to 26 gill rakers. It possesses a pair of pectoral fins and pelvic fins, one dorsal fin, one caudal fin and one anal fin. The pectoral fins have no spines and 14 to 15 soft-rays, the dorsal fin has 14 to 15 spines and 10 to 11 soft-rays, and the anal fin has three (3) spines and 8 to 9 soft-rays.

== Distribution and habitat ==
Placidochromis boops is benthopelagic, and has been observed in a depth range of 74 to 125 metres (243 to 410 ft). It lives exclusively within the freshwater Lake Malawi.

This species has three recorded occurrences, all within the southern portion of Lake Malawi. It has been observed once in Senga Bay, north of the Nankumba Peninsula; and twice in the southwest arm of the lake, between Domwe Island, Senga Bay, and north of Mvunguti.

== Reproduction ==
Little is known about Placidochromis boops reproduction. However, the generation length is estimated to be about 1–2 years.

== Relationship with humans ==
=== Conservation status ===
The IUCN Red List has assessed Placidochromis boops as a least-concern species, as no major, widespread threats to its survival have been identified. The entirety of its geographical distribution overlaps with Lake Malawi National Park, and it has never been collected by the aquarium trade.
