= Archidela rugosicollis =

Scientific classification
- Kingdom: Animalia
- Phylum: Arthropoda
- Class: Insecta
- Order: Coleoptera
- Suborder: Adephaga
- Family: Cicindelidae
- Genus: Archidela
- Species: A. rugosicollis

Binomial name
- Archidela rugosicollis (W.Horn, 1913)

Synonyms
- Cicindela rugosicollis W.Horn, 1913

Species of beetle

Archidela rugosicollis is a species of tiger beetle. This species is found in Australia.
