= Notonomus violaceus =

Scientific classification
- Domain: Eukaryota
- Kingdom: Animalia
- Phylum: Arthropoda
- Class: Insecta
- Order: Coleoptera
- Suborder: Adephaga
- Family: Carabidae
- Genus: Notonomus
- Species: N. violaceus

Binomial name
- Notonomus violaceus (Castelnau, 1834)

Species of beetle

Notonomus violaceus is a species of ground beetle in the subfamily Pterostichinae. It was described by Castelnau in 1834.
