= Placidochromis polli =

Conservation status
- Least Concern (IUCN 3.1)

Scientific classification
- Kingdom: Animalia
- Phylum: Chordata
- Class: Actinopterygii
- Order: Cichliformes
- Family: Cichlidae
- Genus: Placidochromis
- Species: P. polli

Binomial name
- Placidochromis polli (W. E. Burgess & H. R. Axelrod, 1973)

Synonyms
- Lethrinops polli W. E. Burgess & Axelrod, 1973

Species of fish

Placidochromis polli is a species of cichlid endemic to the southern portions of Lake Malawi, where it prefers areas with muddy or sandy substrates at depths of greater than 75 metres (246 ft). This species can reach a length of 14.9 centimetres (5.9 in) SL.

== Etymology ==
Its specific name honours the Belgian ichthyologist Max Poll (1908-1991).
