= Super VC-10 hap =

Conservation status
- Least Concern (IUCN 3.1)

Scientific classification
- Kingdom: Animalia
- Phylum: Chordata
- Class: Actinopterygii
- Order: Cichliformes
- Family: Cichlidae
- Genus: Placidochromis
- Species: P. milomo

Binomial name
- Placidochromis milomo M. K. Oliver, 1989

Synonyms
- Cyrtocara milomo M. K. Oliver, 1984 (ambiguous name)

Species of fish

The Super VC-10 hap (Placidochromis milomo) is a species of cichlid endemic to Lake Malawi along the Malawian shores of the lake. It prefers areas with rocky substrates. This species can reach a length of 18.7 centimetres (7.4 in) SL. It can also be found in the aquarium trade. In the wild uses its thickened lips to scrape algae from rocks and this seems to thicken the lips further, which tends not to be the case with aquarium specimens which have only slightly thickened lips.

It is an extremely thick-lipped species; its specific epithet milomo is the word for "lips" in the Chewa language. The common name of this fish was coined by Peter Davies, a trader in Lake Malawi fish, who compared its rapid flight when he attempted to catch the fish with the Vickers Super VC-10 airliner, the type of aeroplane that flew from Malawi to London at that time.
