= Polli:Nation =

- Founded: 2013
- Type: Community change
- Location: United Kingdom
- Origins: Learning through Landscapes
- Website: www.ltl.org.uk/projects/pollinator-projects/

Polli:Nation was a UK social movement which aims to help protect the future of pollinators through learning about them and making practical changes in school grounds.

Polli:Nation is the name for schools coming together in clusters to collect data about pollinating insects and make improvements for insects based on what they find.

"Free" pollination by bees and other insects is worth over £400 million to UK agriculture each year according to the UK National Ecosystem Assessment, 2011; Polli:Nation is a response to the decline in the abundance and diversity of pollinators in the UK, the demand from schools to broaden children and young people's understanding of the links between pollination and food security, and the need for more trained biodiversity data recorders in the UK.

This movement is currently supported by the Heritage Lottery Fund.
