= Thomas Gibson Sloane =

Australian entomologist (1858–1932)

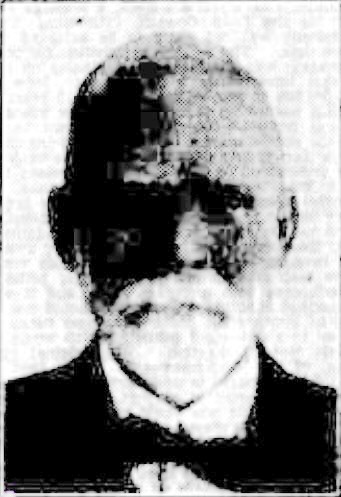
- Born: 20 April 1858; St Kilda, Melbourne
- Died: 20 October 1932 (aged 74); Bunnerong Hospital Young, New South Wales
- Citizenship: Australian
- Known for: study of beetles
- Spouse: Eliza Scholastica Woolfrey (from 10/28/1891)
- Children: 4 daughters and 2 sons
- Scientific career
- Fields: entomology

Thomas Gibson Sloane (20 April 1858 – 20 October 1932) was an Australian sheep grazier and entomologist, considered to be one of the pioneers in Australia's entomology field.

== Early life ==
Sloane was born 20 April 1858 in St Kilda, Melbourne, Colony of Victoria, the second son of merchant and sheep expert Alexander Sloane and homemaker Annabella Helen (née Gibson). He studied for some time at Melbourne's Scotch College.

== Career and personal life ==
From 1888, Sloane served as manager of his father's sheep station, A. Sloane and Sons, in Moorilla, near Young, and later on in 1910 as owner. His sheep earned him recognition at many sheep shows. As an entomologist, Sloane described more than 600 new insect species. His expertise were the ground and tiger beetles. He later became a global authority on ground beetles. "An enthusiastic Darwinian", Sloane wed Eliza Scholastica Woolfrey on 28 October 1891, at the Church of England, Dubbo. They had six children – four were daughters and two were sons.

== Later years and death ==
Fellow entomologist Herbert James Carter described Sloane as "unselfish" and "stoic by nature". However, he suffered a financial crisis in later years. He was reportedly very fit for his age and was free from any illness until a while before his death, when he experienced cardiac asthma. He had planned to retire in Canberra. Sloane died on 20 October 1932 at the Bunnerong Hospital in Young, New South Wales. His wife inherited all of his possessions. Following his death, his widow donated his extensive beetle collection, now known as the Thomas Sloane Collection, to the Division of Economic Entomology of the Council for Scientific and Industrial Research, in accordance of Sloane's wishes.
