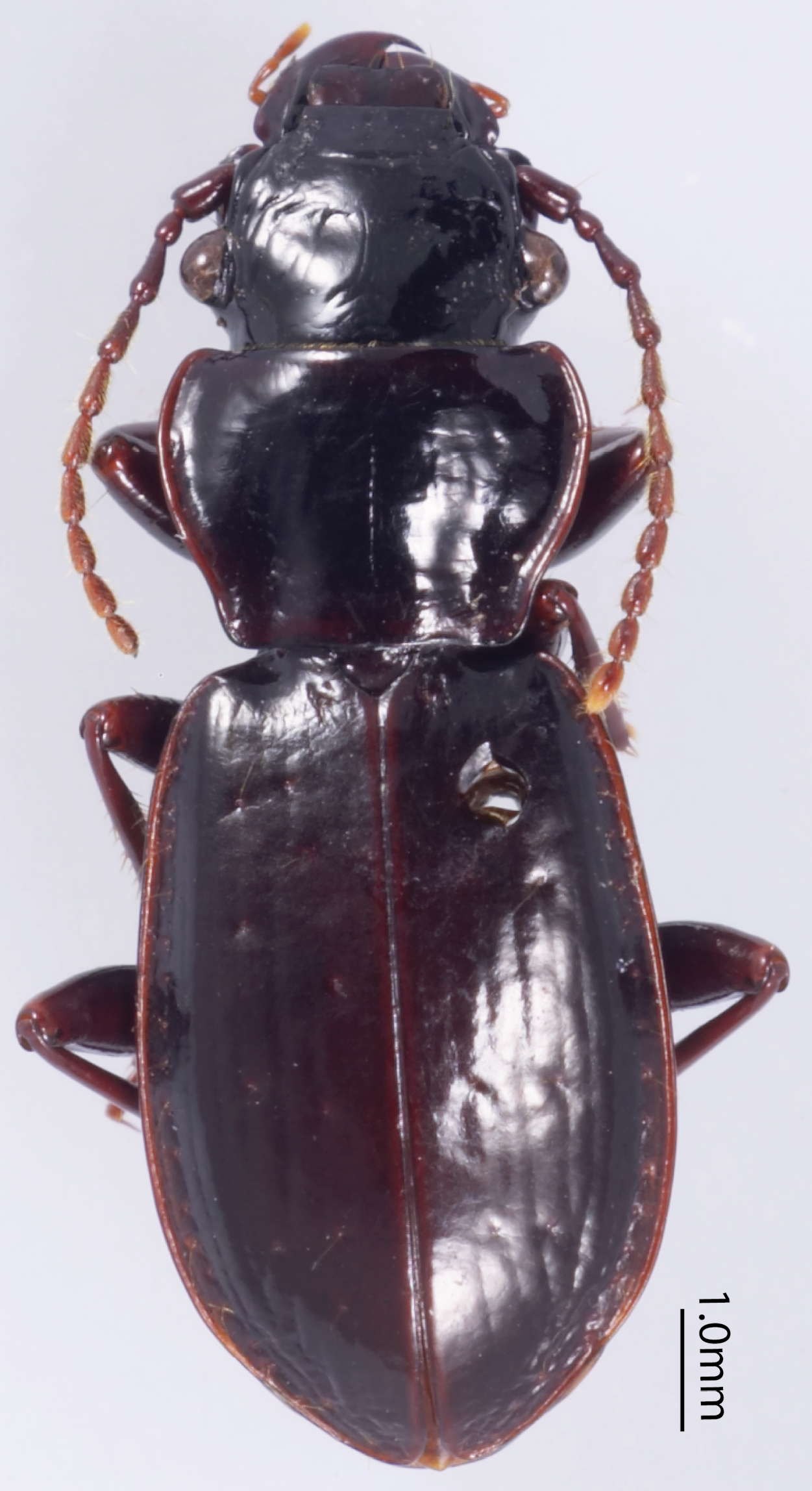
- Dorsal habitus of Holotype of Lesticus finisterrae.

Scientific classification
- Kingdom: Animalia
- Phylum: Arthropoda
- Class: Insecta
- Order: Coleoptera
- Suborder: Adephaga
- Family: Carabidae
- Subfamily: Pterostichinae
- Genus: Lesticus; Dejean, 1828

= Lesticus =

Genus of beetles

Lesticus is a genus of beetles in the family Carabidae first described by Pierre François Marie Auguste Dejean in 1828.

== Species ==
Lesticus contains the following 133 species:

- Lesticus amabilis Chaudoir, 1868
- Lesticus ambulator Darlington, 1962
- Lesticus andamanensis (Chaudoir, 1878)
- Lesticus andrewesi (Straneo, 1938)
- Lesticus aruensis Dubault, Lassalle & Roux, 2013
- Lesticus assamicus Kuntzen, 1911
- Lesticus ater Roux & Shi, 2011
- Lesticus auricollis Tschitscherine, 1900
- Lesticus auripennis Zhu, Shi & Liang, 2018
- Lesticus baehrianus Lassalle & Roux, 2015
- Lesticus baweanicus Straneo, 1953
- Lesticus bennigseni Sloane, 1907
- Lesticus beroni Lassalle, 2012
- Lesticus bii Zhu, Shi & Liang, 2018
- Lesticus borneensis Straneo, 1949
- Lesticus brevilabris Emden, 1936
- Lesticus buqueti (Castelnau, 1834)
- Lesticus busuangae Heller, 1923
- Lesticus cavicollis Straneo, 1985
- Lesticus chalcothorax Chaudoir, 1868
- Lesticus chloronotus (Chaudoir, 1868)
- Lesticus coelestis Tschitscherine, 1897
- Lesticus crenicollis L.Schaufuss, 1887
- Lesticus cupreatus Heller, 1923
- Lesticus cupreoviolaceus Straneo, 1991
- Lesticus cupricollis Pouillaude, 1914
- Lesticus curtus Dubault, Lassalle & Roux, 2012
- Lesticus depressus Darlington, 1962
- Lesticus desgodinsi Tschitscherine, 1894
- Lesticus deuvei Dubault & Roux, 2006
- Lesticus dichrous Tschitscherine, 1897
- Lesticus drescheri Andrewes, 1937
- Lesticus ebeninus Dubault, Lassalle & Roux, 2011
- Lesticus episcopalis Dubault, Lassalle & Roux, 2008
- Lesticus feanus Bates, 1892
- Lesticus finisterrae Will & Kavanaugh, 2012
- Lesticus floresanus Straneo, 1980
- Lesticus freyi Straneo, 1956
- Lesticus fukiensis Jedlicka, 1956
- Lesticus fulgidicollis (Castelnau, 1834)
- Lesticus ganglbaueri Tschitscherine, 1898
- Lesticus gardineri Dubault, Lassalle & Roux, 2012
- Lesticus gracilis Darlington, 1962
- Lesticus gregori Kuntzen, 1911
- Lesticus habilis Dubault, Lassalle & Roux, 2011
- Lesticus harmandi Tschitscherine, 1900
- Lesticus hiekei Straneo, 1980
- Lesticus holzschuhi Straneo, 1985
- Lesticus ignotus Dubault, Lassalle & Roux, 2011
- Lesticus indus Tschitscherine, 1900
- Lesticus insignis Gestro, 1883
- Lesticus insulanus Dubault, Lassalle & Roux, 2008
- Lesticus isabellae Lassalle, 1985
- Lesticus jacobsoni Andrewes, 1929
- Lesticus janthinus Dejean, 1828
- Lesticus kaboureki Lassalle & Roux, 2015
- Lesticus kangeanensis Dubault, Lassalle & Roux, 2012
- Lesticus keieilensis Dubault, Lassalle & Roux, 2008
- Lesticus lakhonus Tschitscherine, 1900
- Lesticus lantschanus Straneo, 1987
- Lesticus latissimus Dubault, Lassalle & Roux, 2012
- Lesticus lautus Andrewes, 1930
- Lesticus lemoulti Kuntzen, 1914
- Lesticus leopoldi Andrewes, 1932
- Lesticus liparops Andrewes, 1932
- Lesticus lombokensis Kirschenhofer, 2007
- Lesticus louwerensi Straneo, 1948
- Lesticus luculentus Lassalle, 2012
- Lesticus magnus Motschulsky, 1860
- Lesticus medius Darlington, 1971
- Lesticus mendax Dubault, Lassalle & Roux, 2008
- Lesticus mouhoti (Chaudoir, 1868)
- Lesticus nepalensis Morvan, 1972
- Lesticus nicobarensis Dubault, Lassalle & Roux, 2013
- Lesticus nigerrimus Straneo, 1953
- Lesticus nigroviolaceus Dubault, Lassalle & Roux, 2008
- Lesticus nubilus Tschitscherine, 1900
- Lesticus obtusus Lassalle, 2012
- Lesticus ornatus Dubault, Lassalle & Roux, 2012
- Lesticus overbecki Emden, 1936
- Lesticus peguensis Bates, 1892
- Lesticus perniger Roux & Shi, 2011
- Lesticus philippinicus Kuntzen, 1911
- Lesticus planicollis (Dejean, 1828)
- Lesticus politocollis Motschulsky, 1865
- Lesticus politus (Chaudoir, 1868)
- Lesticus praestans Chaudoir, 1868
- Lesticus prasinus Tschitscherine, 1900
- Lesticus pseudocupreatus Dubault, Lassalle & Roux, 2011
- Lesticus pseudoliparops Dubault, Lassalle & Roux, 2008
- Lesticus pulchellus Dubault, Lassalle & Roux, 2012
- Lesticus pulcher Lassalle, 2012
- Lesticus punctatostriatus Lassalle & Roux, 2015
- Lesticus purpurascens Straneo, 1959
- Lesticus putzeysi (Chaudoir, 1878)
- Lesticus rainerschnelli Dubault, Lassalle & Roux, 2012
- Lesticus rectangulus (Chaudoir, 1868)
- Lesticus restrictus Dubault, Lassalle & Roux, 2008
- Lesticus rotundatus Roux & Shi, 2011
- Lesticus salomonensis Dubault, Lassalle & Roux, 2011
- Lesticus salvazai Dubault, Lassalle & Roux, 2012
- Lesticus samarensis Dubault, Lassalle & Roux, 2011
- Lesticus samaricus Lassalle & Schnell, 2019
- Lesticus sauteri Kuntzen, 1911
- Lesticus serraticollis (Chaudoir, 1868)
- Lesticus sloanei Dubault, Lassalle & Roux, 2012
- Lesticus solidus Roux & Shi, 2011
- Lesticus stefanschoedli Kirschenhofer, 2005
- Lesticus strangulatus Lassalle, 2012
- Lesticus strictus Tschitscherine, 1897
- Lesticus suavis Tschitscherine, 1897
- Lesticus subcoeruleus Dubault, Lassalle & Roux, 2013
- Lesticus sulabayaensis Kirschenhofer, 2003
- Lesticus sulawesiensis Kirschenhofer, 1997
- Lesticus taiwanicus Roux & Shi, 2011
- Lesticus tenebrosicus Dubault, Lassalle & Roux, 2013
- Lesticus thetis Kirschenhofer, 1997
- Lesticus tonkinensis Jedlicka, 1962
- Lesticus torajaensis Kirschenhofer, 2007
- Lesticus toxopei Darlington, 1962
- Lesticus tricostatus Chaudoir, 1868
- Lesticus tristis Roux & Shi, 2011
- Lesticus uliweberi Lassalle & Schnell, 2019
- Lesticus vandoesburgi Straneo, 1948
- Lesticus vinarius Dubault, Lassalle & Roux, 2011
- Lesticus violaceous Zhu, Shi & Liang, 2018
- Lesticus viridicollis (W.S.Macleay, 1825)
- Lesticus waterhousei Chaudoir, 1862
- Lesticus wegneri Straneo, 1959
- Lesticus wittmeri Morvan, 1980
- Lesticus wrasei Dubault, Lassalle & Roux, 2013
- Lesticus xiaodongi Zhu, Shi & Liang, 2018
