= Lesticus baehri =

Scientific classification
- Domain: Eukaryota
- Kingdom: Animalia
- Phylum: Arthropoda
- Class: Insecta
- Order: Coleoptera
- Suborder: Adephaga
- Superfamily: Caraboidea
- Family: Carabidae
- Subfamily: Pterostichinae
- Genus: Lesticus
- Species: L. baehri

Binomial name
- Lesticus baehri Kirschenhofer, 2007

Synonyms
- Myas baehri (Kirschenhofer, 2007)

Species of beetle

Lesticus baehri is a species in the beetle family Carabidae, found in Thailand.
