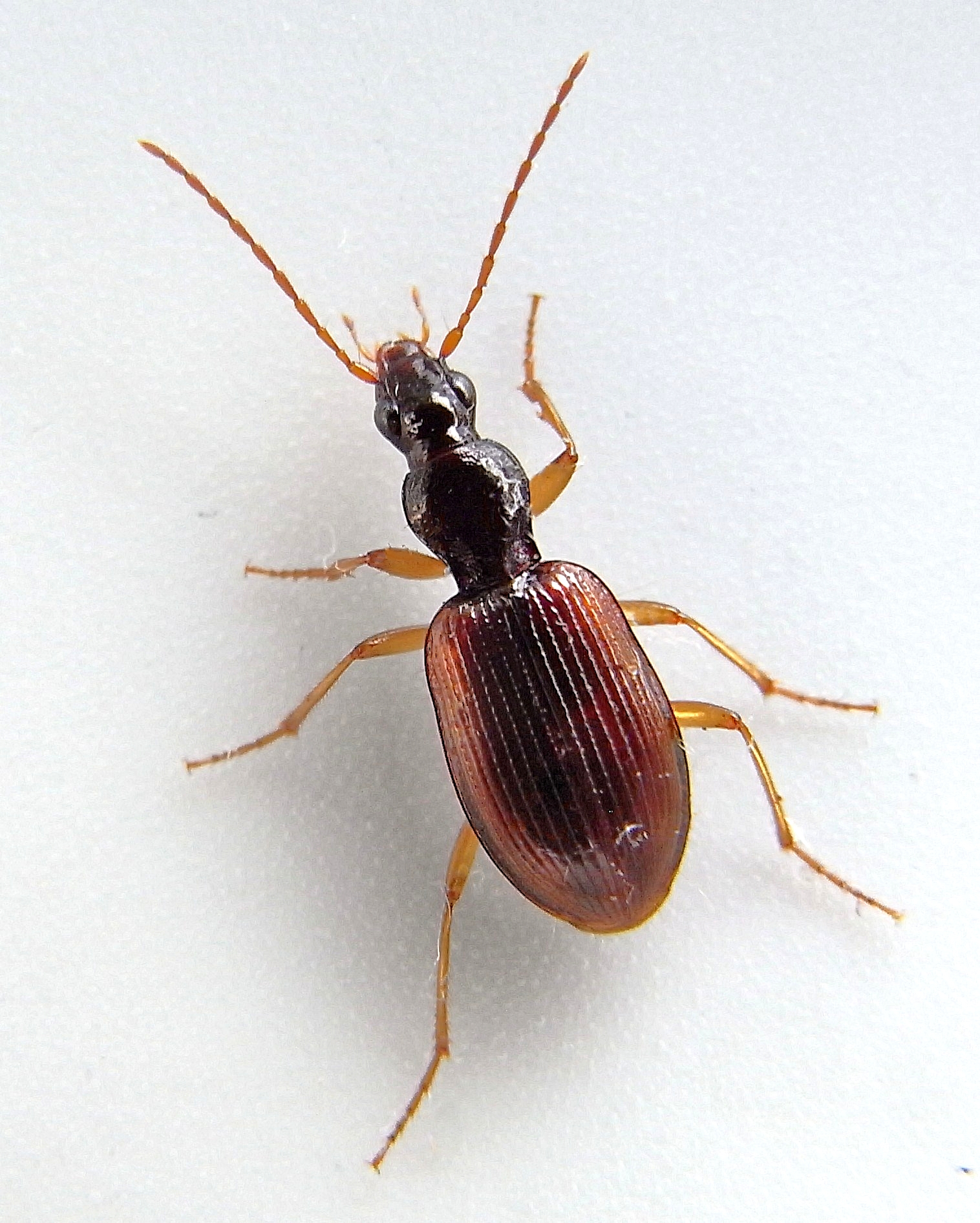
- Oxypselaphus obscurus

Scientific classification
- Kingdom: Animalia
- Phylum: Arthropoda
- Clade: Pancrustacea
- Class: Insecta
- Order: Coleoptera
- Suborder: Adephaga
- Family: Carabidae
- Tribe: Platynini
- Genus: Oxypselaphus; Chaudoir, 1843

= Oxypselaphus =

Genus of beetles

Oxypselaphus is a genus of beetle in the family Carabidae, that contains the following species:

- Oxypselaphus dominici Brandmayr & Zetto Brandmayr, 1984
- Oxypselaphus obscurus (Herbst, 1784)
- Oxypselaphus pusillus (Leconte, 1854)
- Oxypselaphus thielei Brandmayr & Zetto Brandmayr, 1984
