= Taridius =

Scientific classification
- Domain: Eukaryota
- Kingdom: Animalia
- Phylum: Arthropoda
- Class: Insecta
- Order: Coleoptera
- Suborder: Adephaga
- Family: Carabidae
- Subfamily: Lebiinae
- Tribe: Lebiini
- Subtribe: Cymindidina
- Genus: Taridius; Chaudoir, 1875

Genus of beetles

Taridius is a genus of beetles in the family Carabidae, found in Southeast Asia. The genus was described by Chaudoir in 1875.

== Species ==
These 18 species belong to the genus Taridius:

- Taridius abdominalis Fedorenko, 2012 (Vietnam)
- Taridius andrewesi Emden, 1937 (Indonesia)
- Taridius birmanicus Bates, 1892 (Myanmar)
- Taridius coriaceus Fedorenko, 2012 (Vietnam)
- Taridius disjunctus Fedorenko, 2012 (Vietnam)
- Taridius fasciatus Fedorenko, 2012 (Vietnam)
- Taridius jendeki Kirschenhofer, 2010 (India)
- Taridius marginipennis Fedorenko, 2014 (Vietnam)
- Taridius nilgiricus Andrewes, 1935 (India)
- Taridius opaculus Chaudoir, 1875 (Nepal, India, and Myanmar)
- Taridius ornatus Fedorenko, 2012 (Vietnam)
- Taridius pahangensis (Kirschenhofer, 2003) (Malaysia)
- Taridius piceus Fedorenko, 2012 (Vietnam)
- Taridius sabahensis (Kirschenhofer, 2003) (Indonesia and Borneo)
- Taridius stevensi Andrewes, 1923 (India)
- Taridius vietnamensis (Kirschenhofer, 1996) (Vietnam)
- Taridius wrasei Kirschenhofer, 2010 (Indonesia and Borneo)
- Taridius yunnanus Kabak & Wrase, 2014 (China)

== Biology ==
Species of the Carabidae, including the genus Taridius, are predatory ground beetles. The adults can fly but may not choose to do so. They have biting mouthparts, a flattened body shape and hard, protective elytra covering the membranous hind wings. Both adults and larvae are predators although they may also eat some plant matter and are probably scavengers as well. Adults often shelter under objects during the day and emerge at night to hunt. These beetles can usually be found under the bark of trees or in the foliage, under rocks and rotten logs or in crevices in the ground. Taridius species are mainly found in tropical habitats in South East Asia.
