= L. nepalensis =

L. nepalensis may refer to:

- Lacconectus nepalensis, a diving beetle
- Lebia nepalensis, a colorful foliage ground beetle
- Leibnitzia nepalensis, a flowering plant
- Lesticus nepalensis, a ground beetle
- Lilioceris nepalensis, a leaf beetle
- Linyphia nepalensis, a sheet weaver
- Loepa nepalensis, a large moth
