= Lesticus sulabayaensis =

Scientific classification
- Kingdom: Animalia
- Phylum: Arthropoda
- Clade: Pancrustacea
- Class: Insecta
- Order: Coleoptera
- Suborder: Adephaga
- Family: Carabidae
- Genus: Lesticus
- Species: L. sulabayaensis

Binomial name
- Lesticus sulabayaensis Kirschenhofer, 2003

Species of beetle

Lesticus sulabayaensis is a species of beetle belonging in the genus Lesticus, in the family Carabidae and the subfamily Pterostichinae. It was described by Kirschenhofer in 2003.
