= Lesticus buqueti =

Scientific classification
- Domain: Eukaryota
- Kingdom: Animalia
- Phylum: Arthropoda
- Class: Insecta
- Order: Coleoptera
- Suborder: Adephaga
- Family: Carabidae
- Genus: Lesticus
- Species: L. buqueti

Binomial name
- Lesticus buqueti (Castelnau, 1834)

Species of beetle

Lesticus buqueti is a species of ground beetle in the subfamily Pterostichinae. It was described by Castelnau in 1834.
