= Lesticus insignis =

Scientific classification
- Domain: Eukaryota
- Kingdom: Animalia
- Phylum: Arthropoda
- Class: Insecta
- Order: Coleoptera
- Suborder: Adephaga
- Family: Carabidae
- Genus: Lesticus
- Species: L. insignis

Binomial name
- Lesticus insignis Gestro, 1883

Species of beetle

Lesticus insignis is a species of ground beetle in the subfamily Pterostichinae. It was described by Gestro in 1883.
