= Lesticus borneensis =

Scientific classification
- Kingdom: Animalia
- Phylum: Arthropoda
- Class: Insecta
- Order: Coleoptera
- Suborder: Adephaga
- Family: Carabidae
- Genus: Lesticus
- Species: L. borneensis

Binomial name
- Lesticus borneensis Straneo, 1949

Species of beetle

Lesticus borneensis is a species of ground beetle in the subfamily Pterostichinae. It was described by Straneo in 1949.
