= Lesticus magnus =

Scientific classification
- Domain: Eukaryota
- Kingdom: Animalia
- Phylum: Arthropoda
- Class: Insecta
- Order: Coleoptera
- Suborder: Adephaga
- Family: Carabidae
- Genus: Lesticus
- Species: L. magnus

Binomial name
- Lesticus magnus Motschulsky, 1860

Species of beetle

Lesticus magnus is a species of ground beetle in the subfamily Pterostichinae. It was described by Victor Motschulsky in 1860.
