= Lesticus hiekei =

Scientific classification
- Kingdom: Animalia
- Phylum: Arthropoda
- Class: Insecta
- Order: Coleoptera
- Suborder: Adephaga
- Family: Carabidae
- Genus: Lesticus
- Species: L. hiekei

Binomial name
- Lesticus hiekei Straneo, 1980

Species of beetle

Lesticus hiekei is a species of ground beetle in the subfamily Pterostichinae. It was described by Straneo in 1980.
