= Leiolesticus nitescens =

Scientific classification
- Kingdom: Animalia
- Phylum: Arthropoda
- Class: Insecta
- Order: Coleoptera
- Suborder: Adephaga
- Family: Carabidae
- Subfamily: Pterostichinae
- Tribe: Pterostichini
- Subtribe: Pterostichina
- Genus: Leiolesticus
- Species: L. nitescens

Binomial name
- Leiolesticus nitescens (Sloane, 1907)

Synonyms
- Lesticus nitescens

Species of beetle

Leiolesticus nitescens is a species in the beetle family Carabidae. It is found in New Guinea and Papua.
