= Lesticus viridicollis =

Scientific classification
- Kingdom: Animalia
- Phylum: Arthropoda
- Class: Insecta
- Order: Coleoptera
- Suborder: Adephaga
- Family: Carabidae
- Genus: Lesticus
- Species: L. viridicollis

Binomial name
- Lesticus viridicollis (W.S.Macleay, 1825)

Species of beetle

Lesticus viridicollis is a species of ground beetle in the subfamily Pterostichinae. It was described by W.S.Macleay in 1825.
