= Lesticus putzeysi =

Scientific classification
- Domain: Eukaryota
- Kingdom: Animalia
- Phylum: Arthropoda
- Class: Insecta
- Order: Coleoptera
- Suborder: Adephaga
- Family: Carabidae
- Genus: Lesticus
- Species: L. putzeysi

Binomial name
- Lesticus putzeysi (Chaudoir, 1878)

Species of beetle

Lesticus putzeysi is a species of ground beetle in the subfamily Pterostichinae. It was described by Maximilien Chaudoir in 1878.
