= Lesticus jacobsoni =

Scientific classification
- Domain: Eukaryota
- Kingdom: Animalia
- Phylum: Arthropoda
- Class: Insecta
- Order: Coleoptera
- Suborder: Adephaga
- Family: Carabidae
- Genus: Lesticus
- Species: L. jacobsoni

Binomial name
- Lesticus jacobsoni Andrewes, 1929

Species of beetle

Lesticus jacobsoni is a species of ground beetle in the subfamily Pterostichinae. It was described by Andrewes in 1929.
