= Lesticus politocollis =

Scientific classification
- Domain: Eukaryota
- Kingdom: Animalia
- Phylum: Arthropoda
- Class: Insecta
- Order: Coleoptera
- Suborder: Adephaga
- Family: Carabidae
- Genus: Lesticus
- Species: L. politocollis

Binomial name
- Lesticus politocollis Motschulsky, 1865

Species of beetle

Lesticus politocollis is a species of ground beetle in the subfamily Pterostichinae. It was described by Victor Motschulsky in 1865.
