= Lesticus wittmeri =

Scientific classification
- Domain: Eukaryota
- Kingdom: Animalia
- Phylum: Arthropoda
- Class: Insecta
- Order: Coleoptera
- Suborder: Adephaga
- Family: Carabidae
- Genus: Lesticus
- Species: L. wittmeri

Binomial name
- Lesticus wittmeri Morvan, 1980

Species of beetle

Lesticus wittmeri is a species of ground beetle in the subfamily Pterostichinae. It was described by Morvan in 1980.
