= Lesticus coelestis =

Scientific classification
- Domain: Eukaryota
- Kingdom: Animalia
- Phylum: Arthropoda
- Class: Insecta
- Order: Coleoptera
- Suborder: Adephaga
- Family: Carabidae
- Genus: Lesticus
- Species: L. coelestis

Binomial name
- Lesticus coelestis Tschitscherine, 1897

Species of beetle

Lesticus coelestis is a species of ground beetle in the subfamily Pterostichinae. It was described by Tschitscherine in 1897.
