= Lesticus auricollis =

Scientific classification
- Domain: Eukaryota
- Kingdom: Animalia
- Phylum: Arthropoda
- Class: Insecta
- Order: Coleoptera
- Suborder: Adephaga
- Family: Carabidae
- Genus: Lesticus
- Species: L. auricollis

Binomial name
- Lesticus auricollis Tschitscherine, 1900

Species of beetle

Lesticus auricollis is a species of ground beetle in the subfamily Pterostichinae. It was described by Tschitscherine in 1900.
