= Lesticus brevilabris =

Scientific classification
- Domain: Eukaryota
- Kingdom: Animalia
- Phylum: Arthropoda
- Class: Insecta
- Order: Coleoptera
- Suborder: Adephaga
- Family: Carabidae
- Genus: Lesticus
- Species: L. brevilabris

Binomial name
- Lesticus brevilabris Emden, 1936

Species of beetle

Lesticus brevilabris is a species of ground beetle in the subfamily Pterostichinae. It was described by Emden in 1936.
