= Lesticus episcopalis =

Scientific classification
- Domain: Eukaryota
- Kingdom: Animalia
- Phylum: Arthropoda
- Class: Insecta
- Order: Coleoptera
- Suborder: Adephaga
- Family: Carabidae
- Genus: Lesticus
- Species: L. episcopalis

Binomial name
- Lesticus episcopalis Dubault, Lassalle & Roux, 2008

Species of beetle

Lesticus episcopalis is a species of ground beetle in the subfamily Pterostichinae. It was described by Dubault, Lassalle & Roux in 2008.
