= Lesticus tonkinensis =

Scientific classification
- Domain: Eukaryota
- Kingdom: Animalia
- Phylum: Arthropoda
- Class: Insecta
- Order: Coleoptera
- Suborder: Adephaga
- Family: Carabidae
- Genus: Lesticus
- Species: L. tonkinensis

Binomial name
- Lesticus tonkinensis Jedlicka, 1962

Species of beetle

Lesticus tonkinensis is a species of ground beetle in the subfamily Pterostichinae. It was described by Arnošt Jedlička in 1962.
