= Lesticus crenicollis =

Scientific classification
- Domain: Eukaryota
- Kingdom: Animalia
- Phylum: Arthropoda
- Class: Insecta
- Order: Coleoptera
- Suborder: Adephaga
- Family: Carabidae
- Genus: Lesticus
- Species: L. crenicollis

Binomial name
- Lesticus crenicollis L.Schaufuss, 1887

Species of beetle

Lesticus crenicollis is a species of ground beetle in the subfamily Pterostichinae. It was described by L.Schaufuss in 1887.
