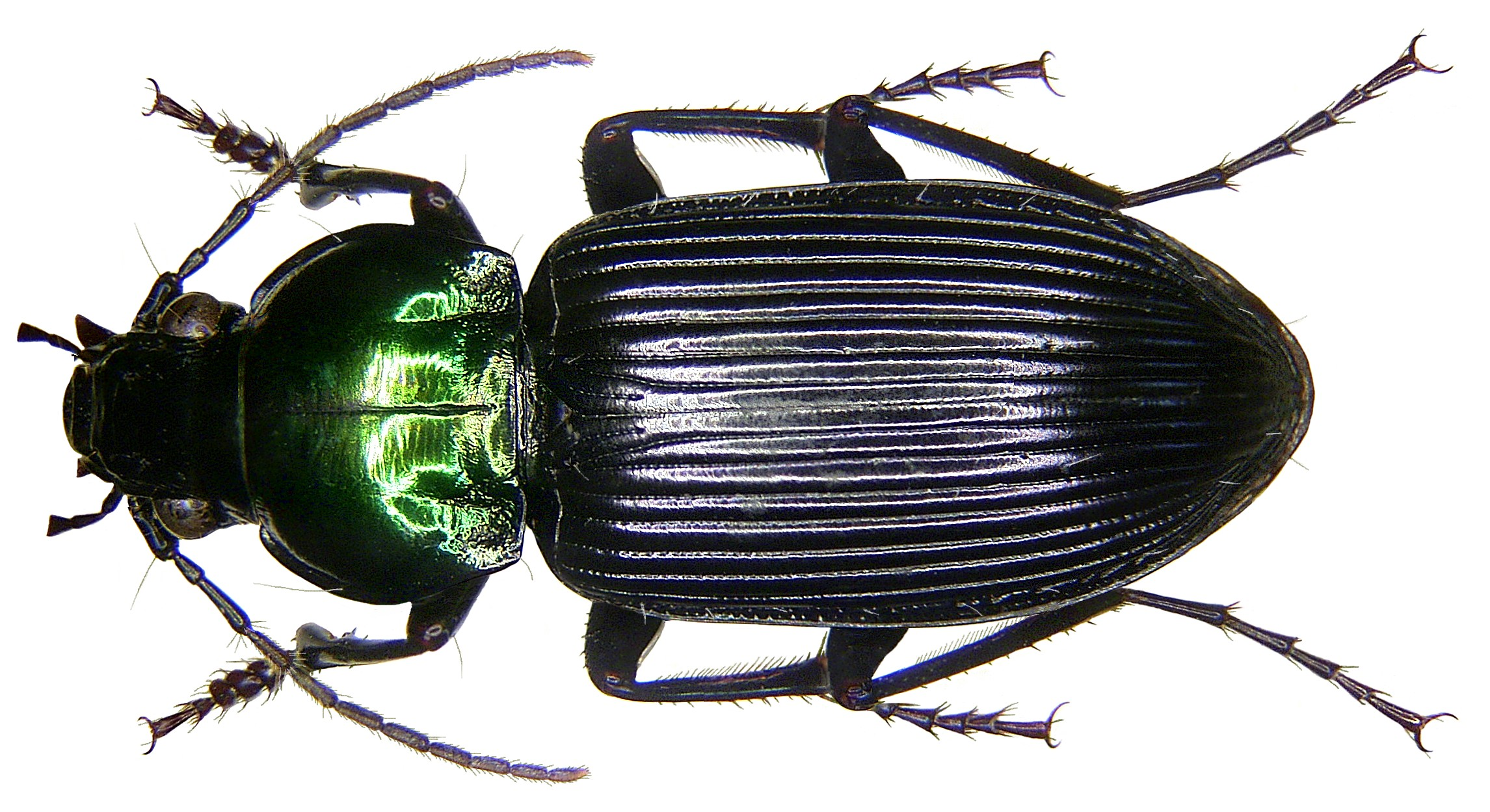

Scientific classification
- Kingdom: Animalia
- Phylum: Arthropoda
- Clade: Pancrustacea
- Class: Insecta
- Order: Coleoptera
- Suborder: Adephaga
- Family: Carabidae
- Genus: Lesticus
- Species: L. nubilus

Binomial name
- Lesticus nubilus Tschitscherine, 1900

= Lesticus nubilus =

Species of beetle

Lesticus nubilus is a species of ground beetle in the subfamily Pterostichinae. It was described by Tschitscherine in 1900.

It is found in Vietnam, Laos, Myanmar, and Thailand. Adults are active in May. The species is approximately 26 mm long.
