= Lesticus mouhotii =

Scientific classification
- Domain: Eukaryota
- Kingdom: Animalia
- Phylum: Arthropoda
- Class: Insecta
- Order: Coleoptera
- Suborder: Adephaga
- Family: Carabidae
- Subfamily: Pterostichinae
- Genus: Lesticus
- Species: L. mouhotii

Binomial name
- Lesticus mouhotii (Chaudoir, 1868)

Synonyms
- Lesticus mouhoti

Species of beetle

Lesticus mouhotii is a species in the beetle family Carabidae. It is found in Cambodia.
