= Lesticus lantschanus =

Scientific classification
- Kingdom: Animalia
- Phylum: Arthropoda
- Class: Insecta
- Order: Coleoptera
- Suborder: Adephaga
- Family: Carabidae
- Genus: Lesticus
- Species: L. lantschanus

Binomial name
- Lesticus lantschanus Straneo, 1987

Species of beetle

Lesticus lantschanus is a species of ground beetle in the subfamily Pterostichinae. It was described by Straneo in 1987.
