= Oxypselaphus pusillus =

Scientific classification
- Domain: Eukaryota
- Kingdom: Animalia
- Phylum: Arthropoda
- Class: Insecta
- Order: Coleoptera
- Suborder: Adephaga
- Family: Carabidae
- Genus: Oxypselaphus
- Species: O. pusillus

Binomial name
- Oxypselaphus pusillus (LeConte, 1854)

Synonyms
- Agonum puncticeps (Casey, 1920); Anchus puncticeps Casey, 1920; Anchus pusillus LeConte, 1854

Species of beetle

Oxypselaphus pusillus is a species of ground beetle in the family Carabidae. It is found in North America.
