= Lesticus feanus =

Scientific classification
- Domain: Eukaryota
- Kingdom: Animalia
- Phylum: Arthropoda
- Class: Insecta
- Order: Coleoptera
- Suborder: Adephaga
- Family: Carabidae
- Genus: Lesticus
- Species: L. feanus

Binomial name
- Lesticus feanus Bates, 1892

Species of beetle

Lesticus feanus is a species of ground beetle in the subfamily Pterostichinae. It was described by Henry Walter Bates in 1892.
