= Lesticus suavis =

Scientific classification
- Domain: Eukaryota
- Kingdom: Animalia
- Phylum: Arthropoda
- Class: Insecta
- Order: Coleoptera
- Suborder: Adephaga
- Family: Carabidae
- Genus: Lesticus
- Species: L. suavis

Binomial name
- Lesticus suavis Tschitscherine, 1897

Species of beetle

Lesticus suavis is a species of ground beetle in the subfamily Pterostichinae. It was described by Tschitscherine in 1897.
