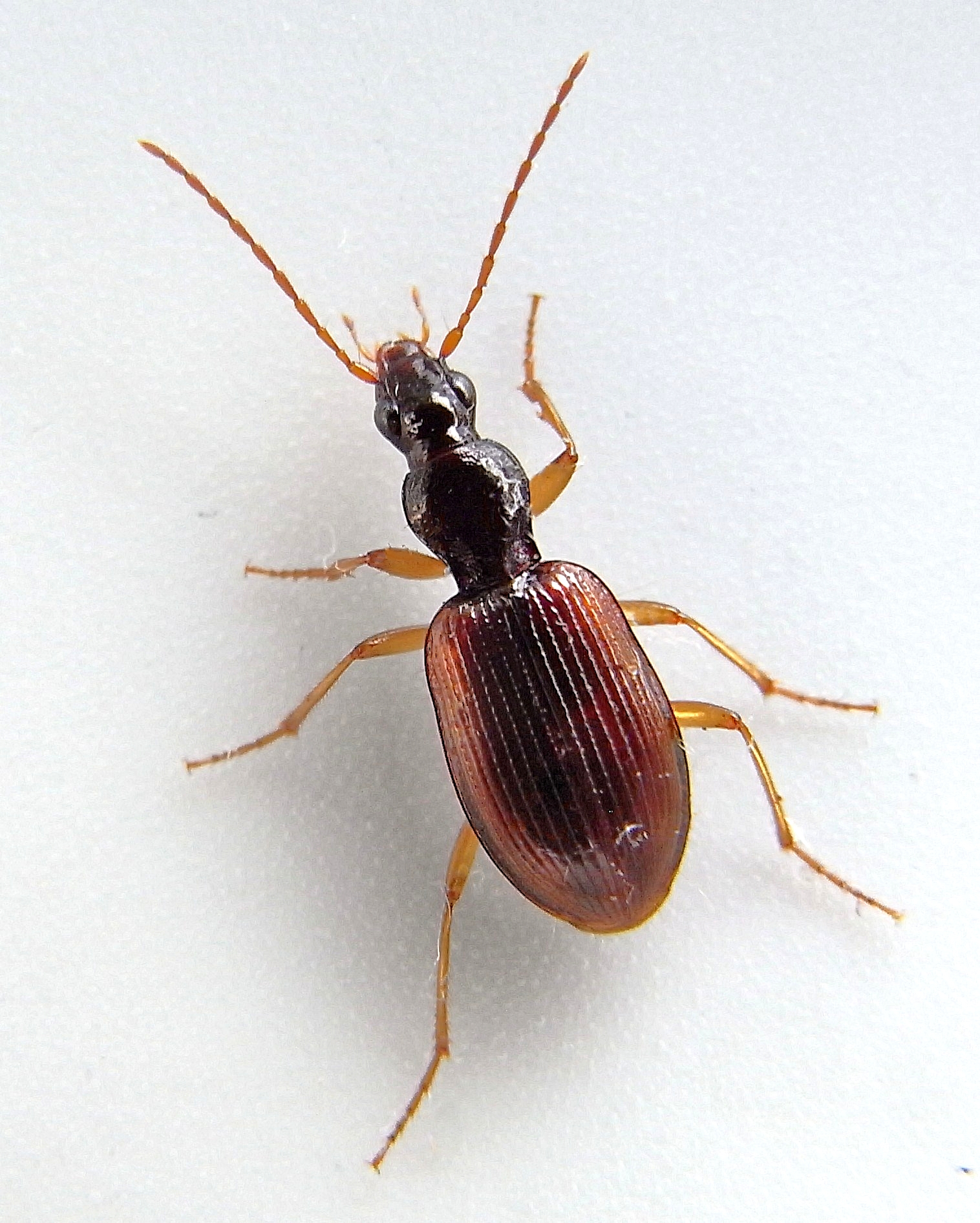
- Oxypselaphus obscurus

Scientific classification
- Kingdom: Animalia
- Phylum: Arthropoda
- Class: Insecta
- Order: Coleoptera
- Suborder: Adephaga
- Family: Carabidae
- Genus: Oxypselaphus
- Species: O. obscurus

Binomial name
- Oxypselaphus obscurus (Herbst, 1784)

Synonyms
- Agonum obscurum (Herbst, 1784); Carabus oblongus Fabricius, 1792; Carabus taeniatus Panzer, 1796

= Oxypselaphus obscurus =

Species of beetle

Oxypselaphus obscurus is a species of beetle from family Carabidae, found everywhere in Europe except for Albania, Andorra, Croatia, Iceland, Malta, Monaco, North Macedonia, Portugal, Romania, San Marino, and Vatican City. The species are black coloured with yellow legs.
