= Lesticus janthinus =

Scientific classification
- Kingdom: Animalia
- Phylum: Arthropoda
- Class: Insecta
- Order: Coleoptera
- Suborder: Adephaga
- Family: Carabidae
- Genus: Lesticus
- Species: L. janthinus

Binomial name
- Lesticus janthinus Dejean, 1828

Species of beetle

Lesticus janthinus is a species of ground beetle in the subfamily Pterostichinae. It was described by Pierre François Marie Auguste Dejean in 1828.
