= Lesticus deuvei =

Scientific classification
- Domain: Eukaryota
- Kingdom: Animalia
- Phylum: Arthropoda
- Class: Insecta
- Order: Coleoptera
- Suborder: Adephaga
- Family: Carabidae
- Genus: Lesticus
- Species: L. deuvei

Binomial name
- Lesticus deuvei Dubault & Roux, 2006

Species of beetle

Lesticus deuvei is a species of ground beetle in the subfamily Pterostichinae. It was described by Dubault & Roux in 2006.
