= Lesticus fukiensis =

Scientific classification
- Domain: Eukaryota
- Kingdom: Animalia
- Phylum: Arthropoda
- Class: Insecta
- Order: Coleoptera
- Suborder: Adephaga
- Family: Carabidae
- Genus: Lesticus
- Species: L. fukiensis

Binomial name
- Lesticus fukiensis Jedlicka, 1956

Species of beetle

Lesticus fukiensis is a species of ground beetle in the subfamily Pterostichinae. It was described by Jedlicka in 1956.
