= Lesticus holzschuhi =

Scientific classification
- Kingdom: Animalia
- Phylum: Arthropoda
- Class: Insecta
- Order: Coleoptera
- Suborder: Adephaga
- Family: Carabidae
- Genus: Lesticus
- Species: L. holzschuhi

Binomial name
- Lesticus holzschuhi Straneo, 1985

Species of beetle

Lesticus holzschuhi is a species of ground beetle in the subfamily Pterostichinae. It was described by Straneo in 1985.
