= Lesticus chalcothorax =

Scientific classification
- Domain: Eukaryota
- Kingdom: Animalia
- Phylum: Arthropoda
- Class: Insecta
- Order: Coleoptera
- Suborder: Adephaga
- Family: Carabidae
- Genus: Lesticus
- Species: L. chalcothorax

Binomial name
- Lesticus chalcothorax Chaudoir, 1868

Species of beetle

Lesticus chalcothorax is a species of ground beetle in the subfamily Pterostichinae. It was described by Maximilien Chaudoir in 1868.
