= Leiolesticus =

Scientific classification
- Kingdom: Animalia
- Phylum: Arthropoda
- Clade: Pancrustacea
- Class: Insecta
- Order: Coleoptera
- Suborder: Adephaga
- Family: Carabidae
- Subfamily: Pterostichinae
- Tribe: Pterostichini
- Subtribe: Pterostichina
- Genus: Leiolesticus; Roux; Lassalle & Dubault, 2016

Genus of beetles

Leiolesticus is a genus in the beetle family Carabidae. There are at least 20 described species in Leiolesticus.

== Species ==
These 20 species belong to the genus Leiolesticus:

- Leiolesticus ambulator (Darlington, 1962) (New Guinea and Papua)
- Leiolesticus baehrianus (Lassalle & Roux, 2015) (Indonesia and New Guinea)
- Leiolesticus bennigseni (Sloane, 1907) (New Guinea and Papua)
- Leiolesticus chloronotus (Chaudoir, 1868) (Australia)
- Leiolesticus dahli (Kuntzen, 1912) (New Guinea and Papua)
- Leiolesticus depressus (Darlington, 1962) (Indonesia and New Guinea)
- Leiolesticus ebeninus (Dubault; Lassalle & Roux, 2011) (Australia)
- Leiolesticus finisterrae (Will & Kavanaugh, 2012) (New Guinea and Papua)
- Leiolesticus gracilis (Darlington, 1962) (Indonesia and New Guinea)
- Leiolesticus insulanus (Dubault; Lassalle & Roux, 2008) (New Guinea and Papua)
- Leiolesticus keieilensis (Dubault; Lassalle & Roux, 2008) (Indonesia)
- Leiolesticus lemoulti (Kuntzen, 1914) (New Guinea)
- Leiolesticus leopoldi (Andrewes, 1932) (Indonesia)
- Leiolesticus liparops (Andrewes, 1932) (Indonesia and New Guinea)
- Leiolesticus medius (Darlington, 1971) (Indonesia and New Guinea)
- Leiolesticus nitescens (Sloane, 1907) (New Guinea and Papua)
- Leiolesticus politus (Chaudoir, 1868) (Indonesia and New Guinea)
- Leiolesticus pseudoliparops (Dubault; Lassalle & Roux, 2008) (New Guinea and Papua)
- Leiolesticus salomonensis (Dubault; Lassalle & Roux, 2011) (the Solomon Islands)
- Leiolesticus toxopei (Darlington, 1962) (Indonesia and New Guinea)
