= Lesticus sulawesiensis =

Scientific classification
- Domain: Eukaryota
- Kingdom: Animalia
- Phylum: Arthropoda
- Class: Insecta
- Order: Coleoptera
- Suborder: Adephaga
- Family: Carabidae
- Genus: Lesticus
- Species: L. sulawesiensis

Binomial name
- Lesticus sulawesiensis Kirschenhofer, 1997

Species of beetle

Lesticus sulawesiensis is a species of ground beetle in the subfamily Pterostichinae. It was described by Kirschenhofer in 1997.
