= Lesticus gregori =

Scientific classification
- Domain: Eukaryota
- Kingdom: Animalia
- Phylum: Arthropoda
- Class: Insecta
- Order: Coleoptera
- Suborder: Adephaga
- Family: Carabidae
- Genus: Lesticus
- Species: L. gregori

Binomial name
- Lesticus gregori Kuntzen, 1911

Species of beetle

Lesticus gregori is a species of ground beetle in the subfamily Pterostichinae. It was described by Kuntzen in 1911.
