= Leiolesticus depressus =

Scientific classification
- Domain: Eukaryota
- Kingdom: Animalia
- Phylum: Arthropoda
- Class: Insecta
- Order: Coleoptera
- Suborder: Adephaga
- Family: Carabidae
- Subfamily: Pterostichinae
- Tribe: Pterostichini
- Subtribe: Pterostichina
- Genus: Leiolesticus
- Species: L. depressus

Binomial name
- Leiolesticus depressus (Darlington, 1962)

Synonyms
- Lesticus depressus Darlington, 1962

Species of beetle

Leiolesticus depressus is a species in the beetle family Carabidae. It is found in Indonesia and New Guinea.
