= Leiolesticus leopoldi =

Scientific classification
- Domain: Eukaryota
- Kingdom: Animalia
- Phylum: Arthropoda
- Class: Insecta
- Order: Coleoptera
- Suborder: Adephaga
- Family: Carabidae
- Subfamily: Pterostichinae
- Tribe: Pterostichini
- Subtribe: Pterostichina
- Genus: Leiolesticus
- Species: L. leopoldi

Binomial name
- Leiolesticus leopoldi (Andrewes, 1932)

Synonyms
- Lesticus leopoldi

Species of beetle

Leiolesticus leopoldi is a species in the beetle family Carabidae. It is found in Indonesia.
