= Lesticus nepalensis =

Scientific classification
- Domain: Eukaryota
- Kingdom: Animalia
- Phylum: Arthropoda
- Class: Insecta
- Order: Coleoptera
- Suborder: Adephaga
- Family: Carabidae
- Genus: Lesticus
- Species: L. nepalensis

Binomial name
- Lesticus nepalensis Morvan, 1972

Species of beetle

Lesticus nepalensis is a species of ground beetle in the subfamily Pterostichinae. It was described by Morvan in 1972.
