= Leiolesticus medius =

Scientific classification
- Domain: Eukaryota
- Kingdom: Animalia
- Phylum: Arthropoda
- Class: Insecta
- Order: Coleoptera
- Suborder: Adephaga
- Family: Carabidae
- Subfamily: Pterostichinae
- Tribe: Pterostichini
- Subtribe: Pterostichina
- Genus: Leiolesticus
- Species: L. medius

Binomial name
- Leiolesticus medius (Darlington, 1971)

Synonyms
- Leiolesticus medius

Species of beetle

Leiolesticus medius is a species in the beetle family Carabidae. It is found in Indonesia and New Guinea.
