= Leiolesticus bennigseni =

Scientific classification
- Kingdom: Animalia
- Phylum: Arthropoda
- Class: Insecta
- Order: Coleoptera
- Suborder: Adephaga
- Family: Carabidae
- Subfamily: Pterostichinae
- Tribe: Pterostichini
- Subtribe: Pterostichina
- Genus: Leiolesticus
- Species: L. bennigseni

Binomial name
- Leiolesticus bennigseni (Sloane, 1907)

Synonyms
- Lesticus bennigseni

Species of beetle

Leiolesticus bennigseni is a species in the beetle family Carabidae. It is found in New Guinea and Papua.
