= Leiolesticus lemoulti =

Scientific classification
- Domain: Eukaryota
- Kingdom: Animalia
- Phylum: Arthropoda
- Class: Insecta
- Order: Coleoptera
- Suborder: Adephaga
- Family: Carabidae
- Subfamily: Pterostichinae
- Tribe: Pterostichini
- Subtribe: Pterostichina
- Genus: Leiolesticus
- Species: L. lemoulti

Binomial name
- Leiolesticus lemoulti (Kuntzen, 1914)

Synonyms
- Lesticus lemoulti

Species of beetle

Leiolesticus lemoulti is a species in the beetle family Carabidae. It is found in New Guinea.
