= Chaudoir =

Chaudoir is a French-language surname and may refer to:

- Elvira Chaudoir (1911–1996), Peruvian socialite and British double agent
- Georges Chaudoir (1847–1923), Belgian competitor at the 1900 Olympics (four-in-hand mail coach)
- Marguerite Chaudoir (1885–1967), Belgian national champion tennis-player and competitor at the 1920 Olympics
- Maximilien Chaudoir (1816–1881), Russian entomologist
