= Cyclotrachelus spoliatus =

Scientific classification
- Kingdom: Animalia
- Phylum: Arthropoda
- Clade: Pancrustacea
- Class: Insecta
- Order: Coleoptera
- Suborder: Adephaga
- Family: Carabidae
- Genus: Cyclotrachelus
- Species: C. spoliatus

Binomial name
- Cyclotrachelus spoliatus (Newman, 1838)

Synonyms
- Feronia spoliata Newman, 1838

Species of beetle

Cyclotrachelus spoliatus is a species of woodland ground beetle in the family Carabidae. It is found in North America.
