= Cyclotrachelus sodalis =

Scientific classification
- Kingdom: Animalia
- Phylum: Arthropoda
- Clade: Pancrustacea
- Class: Insecta
- Order: Coleoptera
- Suborder: Adephaga
- Family: Carabidae
- Genus: Cyclotrachelus
- Species: C. sodalis

Binomial name
- Cyclotrachelus sodalis (LeConte, 1846)

Species of beetle

Cyclotrachelus sodalis is a species of woodland ground beetle in the family Carabidae. It is found in North America.

== Subspecies ==
These three subspecies belong to the species Cyclotrachelus sodalis:

- Cyclotrachelus sodalis colossus (LeConte, 1846)
- Cyclotrachelus sodalis lodingi (Van Dyke, 1926)
- Cyclotrachelus sodalis sodalis (LeConte, 1846)
