= Cyclotrachelus furtivus =

Scientific classification
- Kingdom: Animalia
- Phylum: Arthropoda
- Clade: Pancrustacea
- Class: Insecta
- Order: Coleoptera
- Suborder: Adephaga
- Family: Carabidae
- Genus: Cyclotrachelus
- Species: C. furtivus

Binomial name
- Cyclotrachelus furtivus (LeConte, 1853)

Species of beetle

Cyclotrachelus furtivus is a species of woodland ground beetle in the family Carabidae. It is found in North America.
