= Cyclotrachelus torvus =

Scientific classification
- Kingdom: Animalia
- Phylum: Arthropoda
- Clade: Pancrustacea
- Class: Insecta
- Order: Coleoptera
- Suborder: Adephaga
- Family: Carabidae
- Genus: Cyclotrachelus
- Species: C. torvus

Binomial name
- Cyclotrachelus torvus (LeConte, 1863)

Synonyms
- Evarthrus torvus LeConte, 1863

Species of beetle

Cyclotrachelus torvus is a species of woodland ground beetle in the family Carabidae. It is found in North America.

== Subspecies ==
These two subspecies belong to the species Cyclotrachelus torvus:

- Cyclotrachelus torvus deceptus (Casey, 1918)
- Cyclotrachelus torvus torvus (LeConte, 1863)
