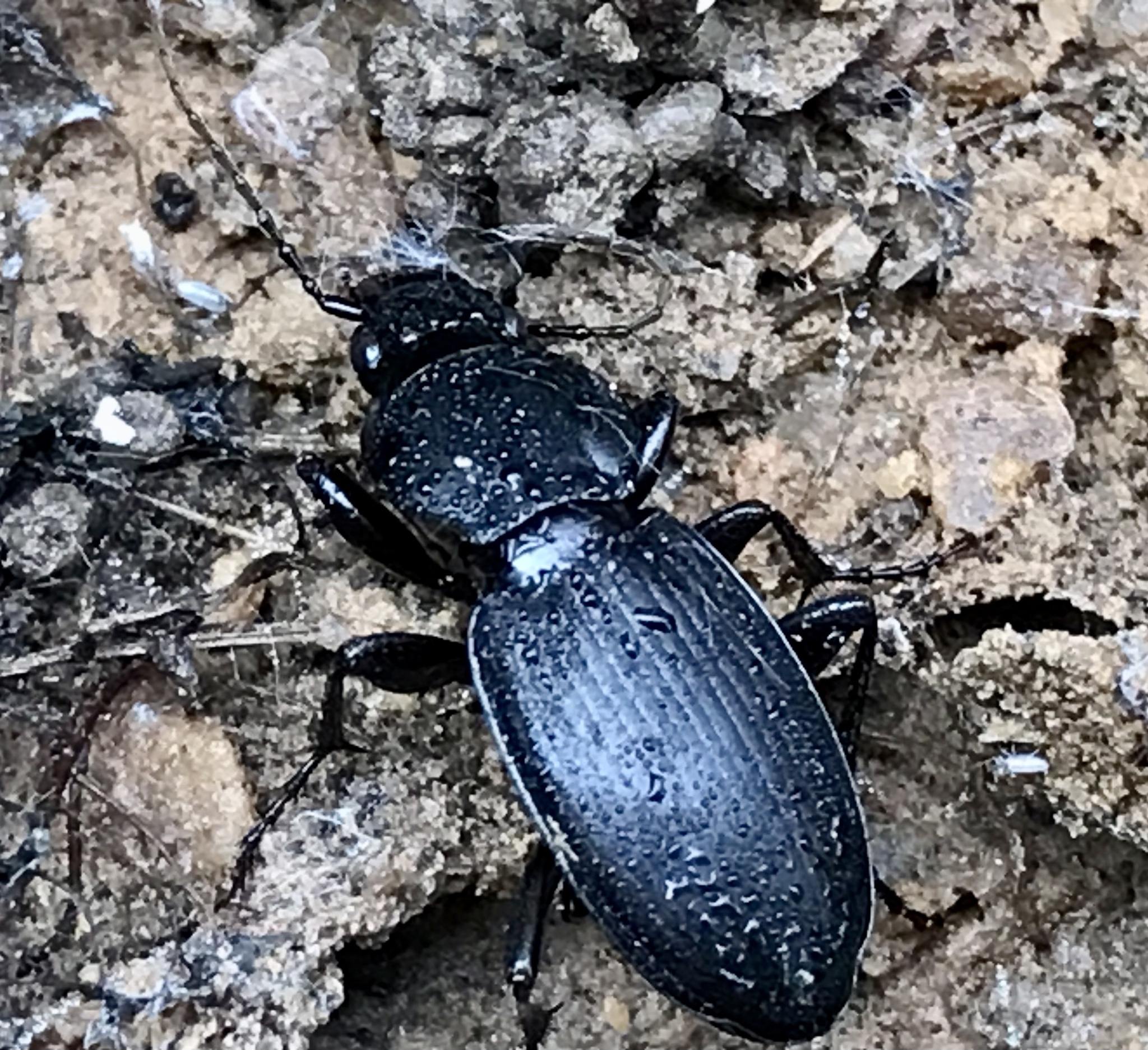
- Cyclotrachelus unicolor, South Carolina

Scientific classification
- Domain: Eukaryota
- Kingdom: Animalia
- Phylum: Arthropoda
- Class: Insecta
- Order: Coleoptera
- Suborder: Adephaga
- Family: Carabidae
- Subfamily: Pterostichinae
- Tribe: Pterostichini
- Genus: Cyclotrachelus; Chaudoir, 1838

Subgenera
- Cyclotrachelus Chaudoir, 1838; Evarthrus LeConte, 1853

= Cyclotrachelus =

Genus of beetles

Cyclotrachelus is a genus in the beetle family Carabidae. There are more than 40 described species in Cyclotrachelus, found in North America.

== Species ==
These 46 species belong to the genus Cyclotrachelus:

- Cyclotrachelus alabamae (Van Dyke, 1926)
- Cyclotrachelus alabamensis (Casey, 1920)
- Cyclotrachelus alternans (Casey, 1920)
- Cyclotrachelus approximatus (LeConte, 1846)
- Cyclotrachelus blatchleyi (Casey, 1918)
- Cyclotrachelus brevoorti (LeConte, 1846)
- Cyclotrachelus constrictus (Say, 1823)
- Cyclotrachelus convivus (LeConte, 1853)
- Cyclotrachelus deceptus (Casey, 1918)
- Cyclotrachelus dejeanellus (Csiki, 1930)
- Cyclotrachelus engelmani (LeConte, 1853)
- Cyclotrachelus faber (Germar, 1823)
- Cyclotrachelus floridensis (Freitag, 1969)
- Cyclotrachelus freitagi Bousquet in Bousquet & Larochelle, 1993
- Cyclotrachelus fucatus (Freitag, 1969)
- Cyclotrachelus furtivus (LeConte, 1853)
- Cyclotrachelus gigas (Casey, 1918)
- Cyclotrachelus gravesi (Freitag, 1969)
- Cyclotrachelus gravidus (Haldeman, 1853)
- Cyclotrachelus hernandensis (Van Dyke, 1943)
- Cyclotrachelus heros (Say, 1823)
- Cyclotrachelus hypherpiformis (Freitag, 1969)
- Cyclotrachelus incisus (LeConte, 1846)
- Cyclotrachelus iowensis (Freitag, 1969)
- Cyclotrachelus iuvenis (Freitag, 1969)
- Cyclotrachelus laevipennis (LeConte, 1846)
- Cyclotrachelus levifaber (Freitag, 1969)
- Cyclotrachelus lodingi (Van Dyke, 1926)
- Cyclotrachelus macrovulum (Freitag, 1969)
- Cyclotrachelus nonnitens (LeConte, 1873)
- Cyclotrachelus ovulum (Chaudoir, 1868)
- Cyclotrachelus parafaber (Freitag, 1969)
- Cyclotrachelus parasodalis (Freitag, 1969)
- Cyclotrachelus sallei (LeConte, 1873)
- Cyclotrachelus seximpressus (LeConte, 1846)
- Cyclotrachelus sigillatus (Say, 1823)
- Cyclotrachelus sinus (Freitag, 1969)
- Cyclotrachelus sodalis (LeConte, 1846)
- Cyclotrachelus spoliatus (Newman, 1838)
- Cyclotrachelus substriatus (LeConte, 1846)
- Cyclotrachelus texensis (Freitag, 1969)
- Cyclotrachelus torvus (LeConte, 1863)
- Cyclotrachelus unicolor (Say, 1823)
- Cyclotrachelus vinctus (LeConte, 1853)
- Cyclotrachelus whitcombi (Freitag, 1969)
- † Cyclotrachelus tenebricus (Scudder, 1900)
