= Cyclotrachelus engelmani =

Scientific classification
- Kingdom: Animalia
- Phylum: Arthropoda
- Clade: Pancrustacea
- Class: Insecta
- Order: Coleoptera
- Suborder: Adephaga
- Family: Carabidae
- Genus: Cyclotrachelus
- Species: C. engelmani

Binomial name
- Cyclotrachelus engelmani (LeConte, 1853)

Synonyms
- Evarthrus engelmani LeConte, 1853

Species of beetle

Cyclotrachelus engelmani is a species of woodland ground beetle in the family Carabidae. It is found in North America.
