= Cyclotrachelus sigillatus =

Scientific classification
- Kingdom: Animalia
- Phylum: Arthropoda
- Clade: Pancrustacea
- Class: Insecta
- Order: Coleoptera
- Suborder: Adephaga
- Family: Carabidae
- Genus: Cyclotrachelus
- Species: C. sigillatus

Binomial name
- Cyclotrachelus sigillatus (Say, 1823)

Synonyms
- Feronia sigillata Say, 1823; Pterostichus nimius (Motschulsky, 1866)

Species of beetle

Cyclotrachelus sigillatus is a species of woodland ground beetle in the family Carabidae. It is found in North America.
