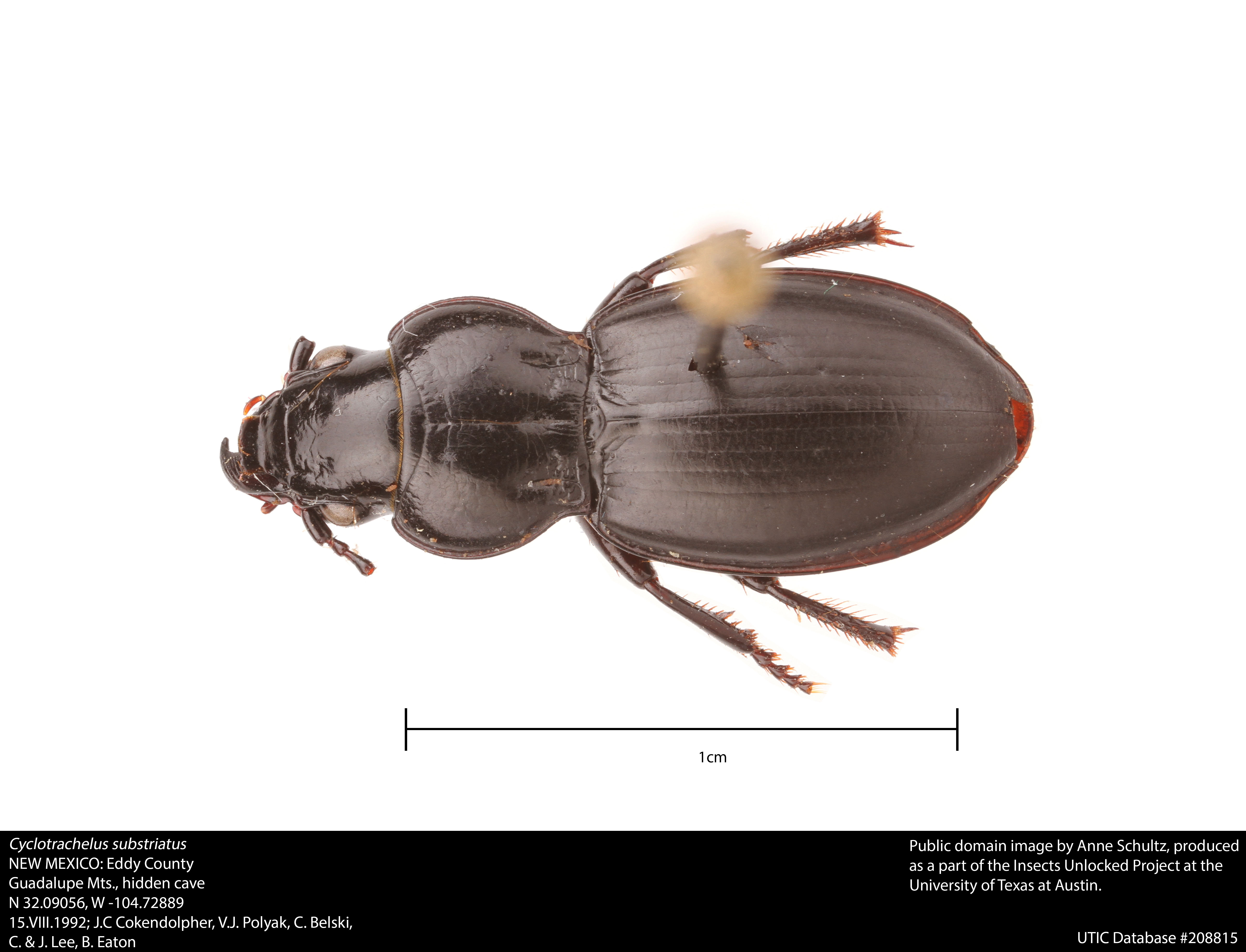

Scientific classification
- Kingdom: Animalia
- Phylum: Arthropoda
- Clade: Pancrustacea
- Class: Insecta
- Order: Coleoptera
- Suborder: Adephaga
- Family: Carabidae
- Genus: Cyclotrachelus
- Species: C. substriatus

Binomial name
- Cyclotrachelus substriatus (LeConte, 1846)

Synonyms
- Feronia substriata LeConte, 1846

= Cyclotrachelus substriatus =

Species of beetle

Cyclotrachelus substriatus is a species of woodland ground beetle in the family Carabidae. It is found in North America.
