= Cyclotrachelus iuvenis =

Scientific classification
- Kingdom: Animalia
- Phylum: Arthropoda
- Clade: Pancrustacea
- Class: Insecta
- Order: Coleoptera
- Suborder: Adephaga
- Family: Carabidae
- Genus: Cyclotrachelus
- Species: C. iuvenis

Binomial name
- Cyclotrachelus iuvenis (Freitag, 1969)

Synonyms
- Evarthrus iuvensis Freitag, 1969

Species of beetle

Cyclotrachelus iuvenis is a species of woodland ground beetle in the family Carabidae. It is found in North America.
