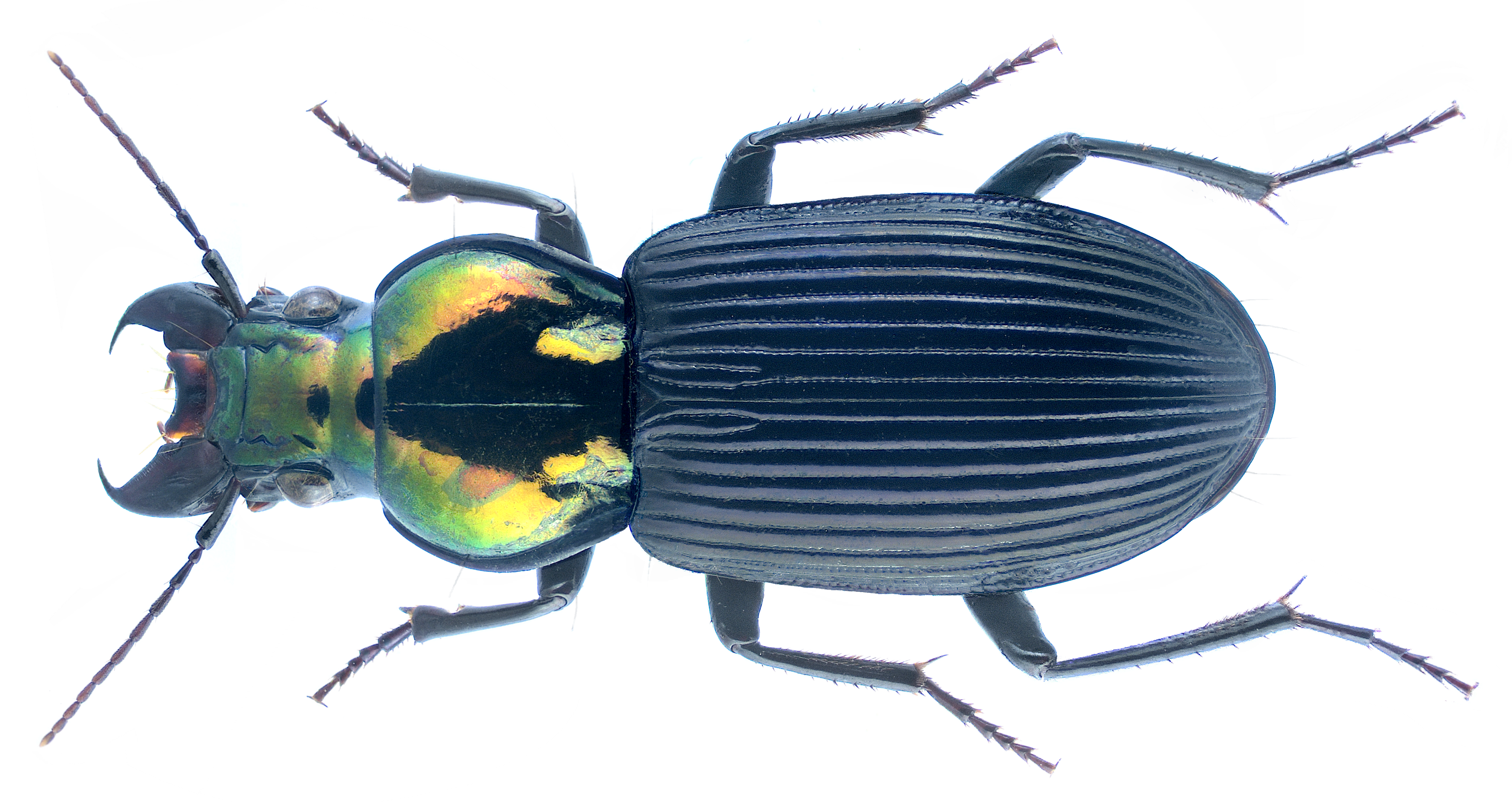
- Trigonotoma nitidicollis

Scientific classification
- Kingdom: Animalia
- Phylum: Arthropoda
- Class: Insecta
- Order: Coleoptera
- Suborder: Adephaga
- Family: Carabidae
- Subfamily: Pterostichinae
- Tribe: Pterostichini
- Subtribe: Pterostichina
- Genus: Trigonotoma; Dejean, 1828

= Trigonotoma =

Genus of beetles

Trigonotoma is a genus in the beetle family Carabidae. There are more than 50 described species in Trigonotoma.

== Species ==
These 54 species belong to the genus Trigonotoma:

- Trigonotoma anthracina Dubault; Lassalle & Roux, 2008 (Myanmar)
- Trigonotoma birmanica Dubault; Lassalle & Roux, 2011 (Myanmar)
- Trigonotoma buehleri Straneo, 1953 (Indonesia)
- Trigonotoma cauta Tschitscherine, 1900 (Indonesia)
- Trigonotoma comotti Gestro, 1883 (Myanmar)
- Trigonotoma concinna Laporte, 1834 (Indonesia)
- Trigonotoma confusa Dubault; Lassalle & Roux, 2010 (Myanmar)
- Trigonotoma constricta Zhu; Shi & Liang, 2020 (China)
- Trigonotoma cylindriceps Straneo, 1985 (India)
- Trigonotoma digitata Zhu; Shi & Liang, 2020 (China)
- Trigonotoma diglipurensis Kirschenhofer, 2011 (India)
- Trigonotoma dohrnii Chaudoir, 1852 (East and Southeast Asia)
- Trigonotoma dubaulti Lassalle & Roux, 2014 (Philippines)
- Trigonotoma funebris Tschitscherine, 1900 (Thailand)
- Trigonotoma himalchuliensis Lassalle, 1985 (Nepal)
- Trigonotoma igneicollis Bates, 1892 (Myanmar)
- Trigonotoma imitatrix Dubault; Lassalle & Roux, 2008 (India)
- Trigonotoma indica Brullé, 1835 (South Asia)
- Trigonotoma iodes Bates, 1892 (India)
- Trigonotoma kalaoensis Dubault; Lassalle & Roux, 2011 (Indonesia)
- Trigonotoma kuntzeni Hubenthal, 1914 (Indonesia, Borneo)
- Trigonotoma lamprodera Bates, 1892 (Myanmar)
- Trigonotoma ledouxi Dubault; Lassalle & Roux, 2010 (Vietnam)
- Trigonotoma leotaudi Tschitscherine, 1900 (Philippines)
- Trigonotoma lewisii Bates, 1873 (East and Southeast Asia)
- Trigonotoma lucens Dubault; Lassalle & Roux, 2011 (Indonesia)
- Trigonotoma lumawigi Straneo, 1987 (Philippines)
- Trigonotoma luzonica Chaudoir, 1868 (Philippines)
- Trigonotoma minuscula Roux; Lassalle & Dubault, 2016 (Philippines)
- Trigonotoma morvani Deuve & Lassalle, 1983 (Nepal)
- Trigonotoma niasana Tschitscherine, 1898 (Indonesia)
- Trigonotoma nigricans Dubault; Lassalle & Roux, 2011 (Indonesia)
- Trigonotoma nigrissima Lassalle & Roux, 2015 (Philippines)
- Trigonotoma nitidicollis Chaudoir, 1868 (Southeast Asia)
- Trigonotoma oberthueri Tschitscherine, 1894 (China, Bhutan, India)
- Trigonotoma otadoyae Lassalle & Schnell, 2018 (Philippines)
- Trigonotoma ovalis Dubault; Lassalle & Roux, 2008 (Myanmar)
- Trigonotoma palavanica Tschitscherine, 1897 (Philippines)
- Trigonotoma perraudierei Bates, 1889 (Myanmar, Thailand, Vietnam)
- Trigonotoma peteli Laporte, 1834 (Indonesia)
- Trigonotoma philippinica Straneo, 1967 (Philippines)
- Trigonotoma pierremorvani Dubault; Lassalle & Roux, 2010 (Thailand)
- Trigonotoma poggii Dubault; Lassalle & Roux, 2010 (Myanmar)
- Trigonotoma psyche Tschitscherine, 1897 (Indonesia, Borneo)
- Trigonotoma puella Tschitscherine, 1898 (Indonesia)
- Trigonotoma similis Chaudoir, 1868 (India)
- Trigonotoma sinica Dubault; Lassalle & Roux, 2011 (China)
- Trigonotoma stricta Dubault; Lassalle & Roux, 2011 (Vietnam)
- Trigonotoma submetallica Dubault; Lassalle & Roux, 2008 (Myanmar)
- Trigonotoma subviolacea Dubault; Lassalle & Roux, 2011 (Indonesia, Borneo)
- Trigonotoma tenebrosa Dubault; Lassalle & Roux, 2008 (India)
- Trigonotoma venus Tschitscherine, 1897 (Indonesia, Borneo)
- Trigonotoma verberifera L.Schaufuss, 1887 (Indonesia, Borneo)
- Trigonotoma wegneri Straneo, 1963 (Indonesia)
