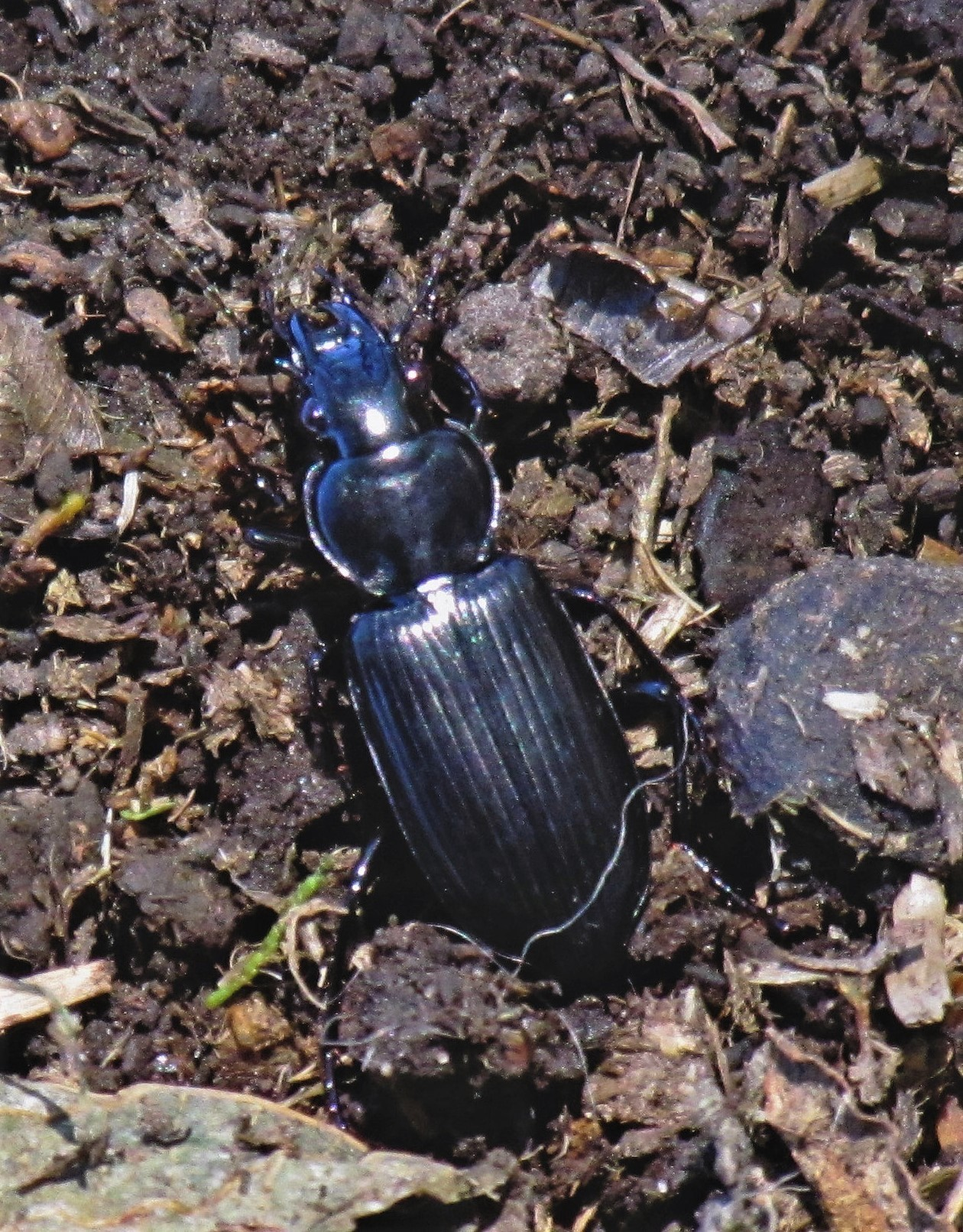
- Pachymorphus moerens, Argentina

Scientific classification
- Domain: Eukaryota
- Kingdom: Animalia
- Phylum: Arthropoda
- Class: Insecta
- Order: Coleoptera
- Suborder: Adephaga
- Family: Carabidae
- Subfamily: Pterostichinae
- Tribe: Pterostichini
- Subtribe: Pterostichina
- Genus: Pachymorphus; Chaudoir, 1838

Synonyms
- Feroniomorpha Chaudoir, 1876; Feronomorpha Solier, 1849; Nortes Motschulsky, 1866

= Pachymorphus =

Genus of beetles

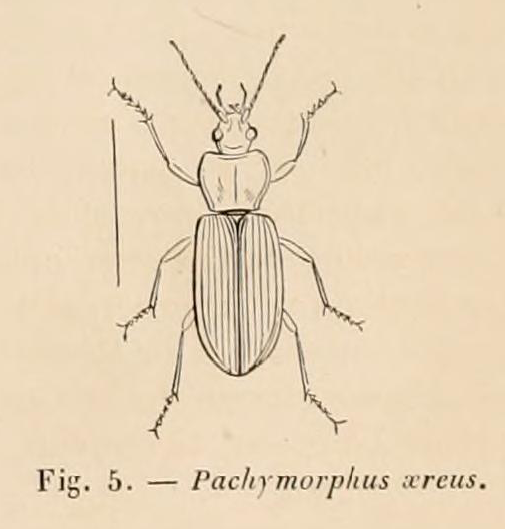
Pachymorphus aereus

Pachymorphus is a genus in the ground beetle family Carabidae. There are about 14 described species in Pachymorphus, found in South America.

== Species ==
These 14 species belong to the genus Pachymorphus:

- Pachymorphus adelosioides (Chaudoir, 1878) (Argentina, Uruguay)
- Pachymorphus aereus (Dejean, 1828) (Chile, Argentina)
- Pachymorphus chalceus (Dejean, 1828) (Chile, Argentina, Uruguay)
- Pachymorphus currens (Brullé, 1838) (Uruguay)
- Pachymorphus glaucus (Straneo, 1967) (Argentina)
- Pachymorphus lucidus (Curtis, 1839) (Chile, Argentina)
- Pachymorphus moerens (Brullé, 1838) (Argentina)
- Pachymorphus nebrioides (Curtis, 1839) (Chile, Argentina)
- Pachymorphus nicki (Emden, 1958) (Argentina)
- Pachymorphus orbignyi (Tschitscherine, 1900) (Bolivia, Brazil)
- Pachymorphus striatulus (Fabricius, 1775) (Chile, Argentina, Uruguay, Brazil)
- Pachymorphus subcorynthius (Straneo, 1967) (Argentina)
- Pachymorphus substriatulus (Straneo, 1967) (Bolivia)
- Pachymorphus violaceus (Straneo, 1987) (Argentina)
