= Platycoelus =

- Platycaelus melliei

Scientific classification
- Kingdom: Animalia
- Phylum: Arthropoda
- Class: Insecta
- Order: Coleoptera
- Suborder: Adephaga
- Family: Carabidae
- Subfamily: Pterostichinae
- Tribe: Pterostichini
- Subtribe: Pterostichina
- Genus: Platycoelus; Blanchard, 1843

Synonyms
- Platycaelus

Genus of beetles

Platycoelus is a genus of in the beetle family Carabidae. There are about 19 described species in Platycoelus.

== Species ==
These 19 species belong to the genus Platycoelus:

- Platycoelus archboldi Darlington, 1962 (Indonesia and New Guinea)
- Platycoelus biroi Darlington, 1962 (New Guinea)
- Platycoelus brigalowphilus Will, 2015 (Australia)
- Platycoelus caledonicus (Tschitscherine, 1901) (New Caledonia)
- Platycoelus chongheeae Will, 2015 (Australia)
- Platycoelus depressus Blanchard, 1843 (Indonesia, New Guinea, and Samoa)
- Platycoelus hermes Will, 2015 (New Guinea and Papua)
- Platycoelus interstitialis (Sloane, 1910) (Australia)
- Platycoelus irideomicans (Tschitscherine, 1891) (New Caledonia and Australia)
- Platycoelus jedlickai (Straneo, 1938) (Indonesia)
- Platycoelus major (Straneo, 1942) (New Guinea)
- Platycoelus melliei (Montrouzier, 1860) (Indonesia and Australia)
- Platycoelus orion Will, 2015 (Australia)
- Platycoelus planipennis (W.J.MacLeay, 1871) (New Guinea and Australia)
- Platycoelus poeciloides (Chaudoir, 1878) (Australia)
- Platycoelus politissimus (White, 1846)
- Platycoelus politus Will, 2015 (Australia)
- Platycoelus prolixus (Erichson, 1842) (Australia)
- Platycoelus sulcatulus (W.J.MacLeay, 1888) (Australia)
