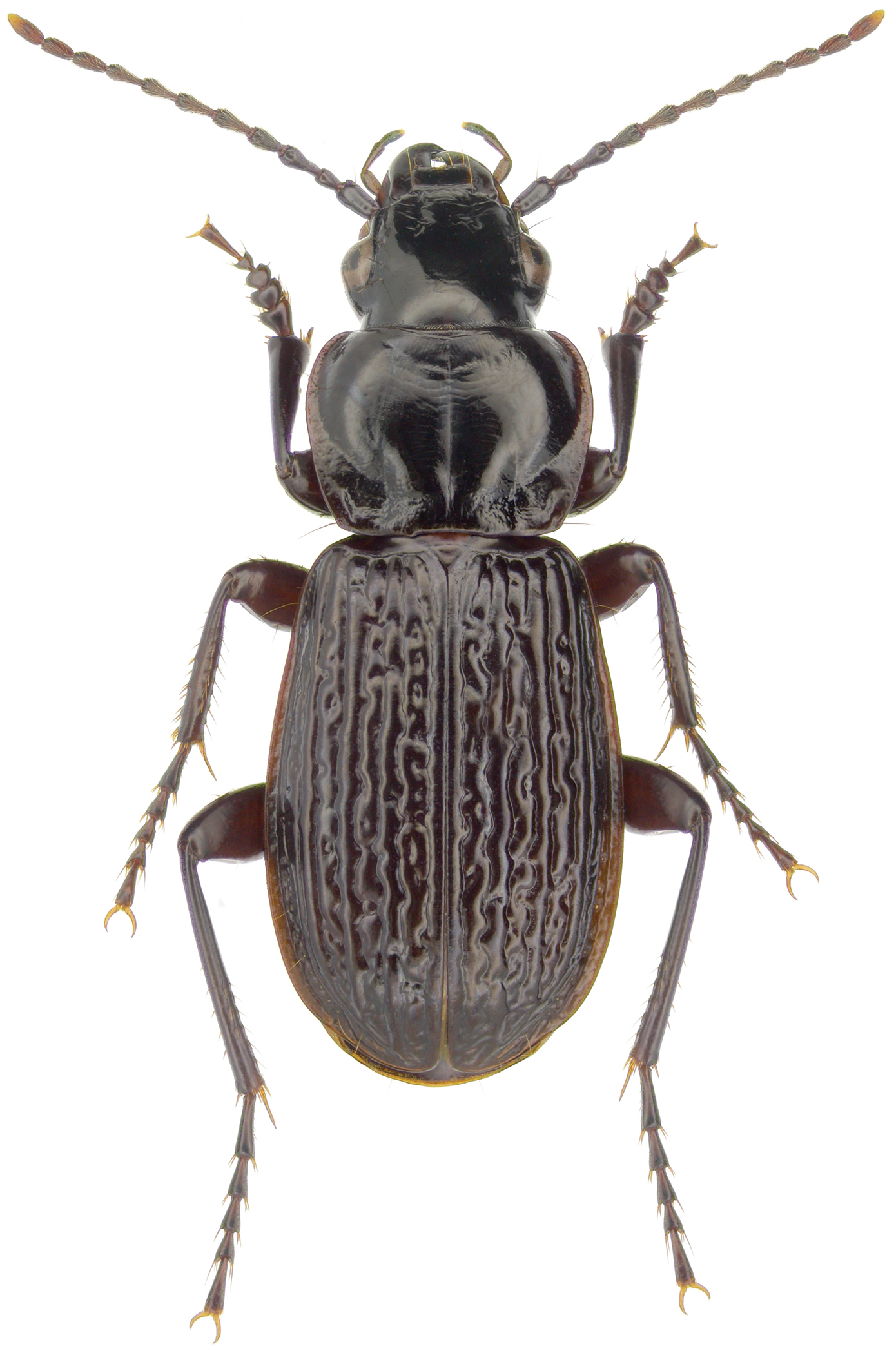
- Platycoelus politissimus

Scientific classification
- Kingdom: Animalia
- Phylum: Arthropoda
- Class: Insecta
- Order: Coleoptera
- Suborder: Adephaga
- Family: Carabidae
- Subfamily: Pterostichinae
- Tribe: Pterostichini
- Subtribe: Pterostichina
- Genus: Platycoelus
- Species: P. politissimus

Binomial name
- Platycoelus politissimus (White, 1846)

Synonyms
- Psegmatopterus politissimus Chaudoir, 1878

= Platycoelus politissimus =

Genus of beetles

Platycoelus politissimus is a species in the beetle family Carabidae.
