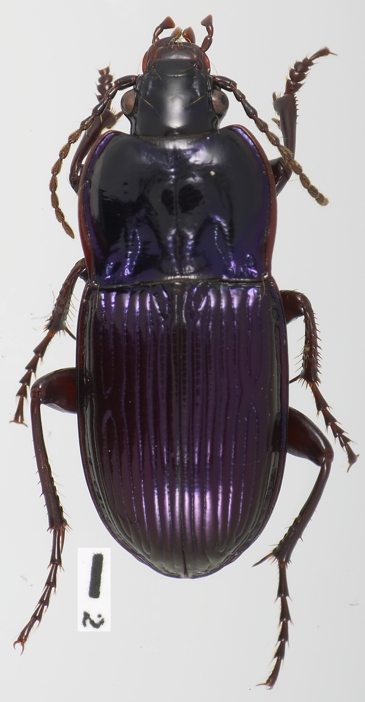
- Myas coracinus

Scientific classification
- Domain: Eukaryota
- Kingdom: Animalia
- Phylum: Arthropoda
- Class: Insecta
- Order: Coleoptera
- Suborder: Adephaga
- Family: Carabidae
- Subfamily: Pterostichinae
- Tribe: Pterostichini
- Genus: Myas; Sturm, 1826

Subgenera
- Myas Sturm, 1826; Neomyas Allen, 1980; Trigonognatha Motschulsky, 1857

Synonyms
- Trigonognatha

= Myas =

Genus of beetles

Myas is a genus of in the beetle family Carabidae. There are more than 40 described species in Myas.

== Species ==
These 41 species belong to the genus Myas:

- Myas andrewesi (Jedlicka, 1932) (China)
- Myas asperipennis Habu, 1978 (Taiwan)
- Myas becvari (Sciaky, 1995) (China)
- Myas bicolor (Lassalle, 2010) (China)
- Myas birmancus Lassalle, 2010 (Myanmar)
- Myas brancuccii (Sciaky, 1995) (China)
- Myas cavazzutii (Casale & Sciaky, 1994) (China)
- Myas chalybeus (Palliardi, 1825) (Europe)
- Myas coracinus (Say, 1823) (the United States and Canada)
- Myas cordicollis (Sciaky & Wrase, 1997) (China)
- Myas coreanus (Tschitscherine, 1895) (North Korea and Japan)
- Myas cuprescens (Motschulsky, 1857) (Japan)
- Myas cyanescens Dejean, 1828 (the United States and Canada)
- Myas delavayi (Fairmaire, 1889) (China)
- Myas echarouxi (Lassalle, 2010) (China)
- Myas eous (Tschitscherine, 1894) (China)
- Myas fairmairei (Sciaky, 1995) (China)
- Myas feanus (Bates, 1892) (China and Myanmar)
- Myas ferreroi (Straneo, 1991) (Thailand)
- Myas formosanus (Jedlicka, 1940) (Taiwan)
- Myas hauseri (Jedlicka, 1933) (China)
- Myas henanensis (Kirschenhofer, 2011) (China)
- Myas hubeicus (Facchini & Sciaky, 2003) (China)
- Myas jaechi (Sciaky, 1995) (China)
- Myas kutsherai (Sciaky & Wrase, 1997) (China)
- Myas latibasis (Sciaky & Wrase, 1997) (China)
- Myas princeps (Bates, 1883) (China)
- Myas prunieri (Lassalle, 2010) (China)
- Myas robustus (Fairmaire, 1894) (China)
- Myas saueri (Sciaky, 1995) (China)
- Myas schuetzei (Sciaky & Wrase, 1997) (China)
- Myas smetanai (Sciaky, 1995) (Taiwan)
- Myas straneoi (Sciaky & Wrase, 1997) (China)
- Myas tonkinensis (Lassalle, 2010) (Vietnam)
- Myas uenoi Habu, 1978 (Taiwan)
- Myas vignai (Casale & Sciaky, 1994) (China)
- Myas viridis (Tschitscherine, 1898) (China)
- Myas xichangensis (Lassalle, 2010) (China)
- Myas yunnanus (Straneo, 1943) (China)
- † Myas rigefactus Scudder, 1900
- † Myas umbrarum Scudder, 1900
