= Myas cyanescens =

Scientific classification
- Kingdom: Animalia
- Phylum: Arthropoda
- Class: Insecta
- Order: Coleoptera
- Suborder: Adephaga
- Family: Carabidae
- Genus: Myas
- Species: M. cyanescens

Binomial name
- Myas cyanescens Dejean, 1828

Synonyms
- Myas lindrothi (Allen, 1980)

Species of beetle

Myas cyanescens is a species of woodland ground beetle in the family Carabidae. It is found in North America.
