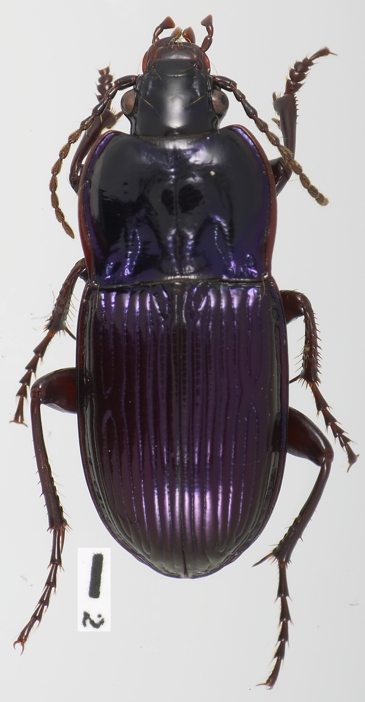

Scientific classification
- Domain: Eukaryota
- Kingdom: Animalia
- Phylum: Arthropoda
- Class: Insecta
- Order: Coleoptera
- Suborder: Adephaga
- Family: Carabidae
- Genus: Myas
- Species: M. coracinus

Binomial name
- Myas coracinus (Say, 1823)

= Myas coracinus =

Species of beetle

Myas coracinus is a species of woodland ground beetle in the family Carabidae. It is found in North America.
