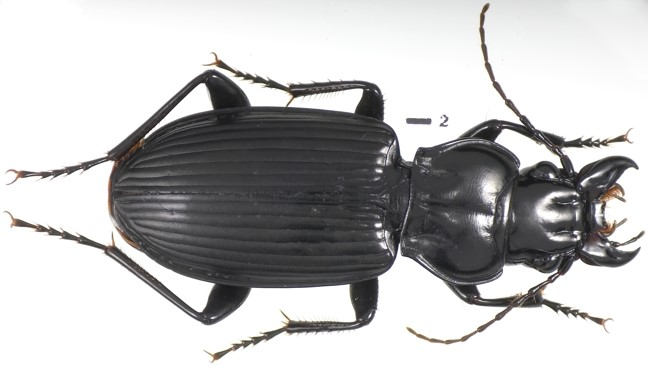

Scientific classification
- Kingdom: Animalia
- Phylum: Arthropoda
- Class: Insecta
- Order: Coleoptera
- Suborder: Adephaga
- Family: Carabidae
- Genus: Lophoglossus
- Species: L. haldemanni

Binomial name
- Lophoglossus haldemanni (LeConte, 1846)

Synonyms
- Lyperus haldemanni LeConte, 1846

= Lophoglossus haldemanni =

Species of beetle

Lophoglossus haldemanni is a species of woodland ground beetle in the family Carabidae. It is found in North America.
