= Lophoglossus scrutator =

Scientific classification
- Kingdom: Animalia
- Phylum: Arthropoda
- Class: Insecta
- Order: Coleoptera
- Suborder: Adephaga
- Family: Carabidae
- Genus: Lophoglossus
- Species: L. scrutator

Binomial name
- Lophoglossus scrutator (LeConte, 1846)

Synonyms
- Feronia canadensis Chaudoir, 1868; Lophoglossus bispiculatus Casey, 1913; Lophoglossus illini Casey, 1913; Lyperus scrutator LeConte, 1846; Pterostichus bispiculatus (Casey, 1913); Pterostichus illini (Casey, 1913)

Species of beetle

Lophoglossus scrutator is a species of woodland ground beetle in the family Carabidae. It is found in North America.
