= Lophoglossus substrenuus =

Scientific classification
- Domain: Eukaryota
- Kingdom: Animalia
- Phylum: Arthropoda
- Class: Insecta
- Order: Coleoptera
- Suborder: Adephaga
- Family: Carabidae
- Genus: Lophoglossus
- Species: L. substrenuus

Binomial name
- Lophoglossus substrenuus (Csiki, 1930)

Species of beetle

Lophoglossus substrenuus is a species of woodland ground beetle in the family Carabidae. It is found in North America.
