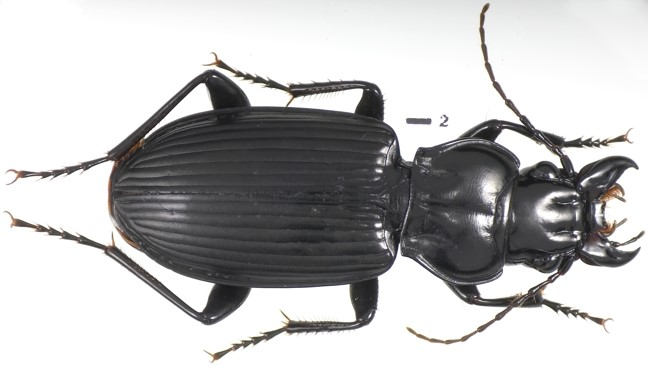
- Lophoglossus haldemanni

Scientific classification
- Kingdom: Animalia
- Phylum: Arthropoda
- Class: Insecta
- Order: Coleoptera
- Suborder: Adephaga
- Family: Carabidae
- Tribe: Pterostichini
- Genus: Lophoglossus; LeConte, 1852

= Lophoglossus =

Genus of beetles

Lophoglossus is a genus of beetles in the family Carabidae, containing the following species:

- Lophoglossus gravis LeConte, 1873
- Lophoglossus haldemanni (LeConte, 1848)
- Lophoglossus scrutator (LeConte, 1848)
- Lophoglossus substrenuus (Csiki, 1930)
- Lophoglossus tartaricus (Say, 1823)
- Lophoglossus vernix Casey, 1913
