= Lophoglossus gravis =

Scientific classification
- Kingdom: Animalia
- Phylum: Arthropoda
- Class: Insecta
- Order: Coleoptera
- Suborder: Adephaga
- Family: Carabidae
- Genus: Lophoglossus
- Species: L. gravis

Binomial name
- Lophoglossus gravis LeConte, 1873

Species of beetle

Lophoglossus gravis is a species of woodland ground beetle in the family Carabidae. It is found in North America.
