= Pterostichus atratus =

Scientific classification
- Domain: Eukaryota
- Kingdom: Animalia
- Phylum: Arthropoda
- Class: Insecta
- Order: Coleoptera
- Suborder: Adephaga
- Family: Carabidae
- Genus: Pterostichus
- Species: P. atratus

Binomial name
- Pterostichus atratus (Newman, 1838)

Species of beetle

Pterostichus atratus is a species of woodland ground beetle in the family Carabidae. It is sometimes considered a species of the genus Abacidus
