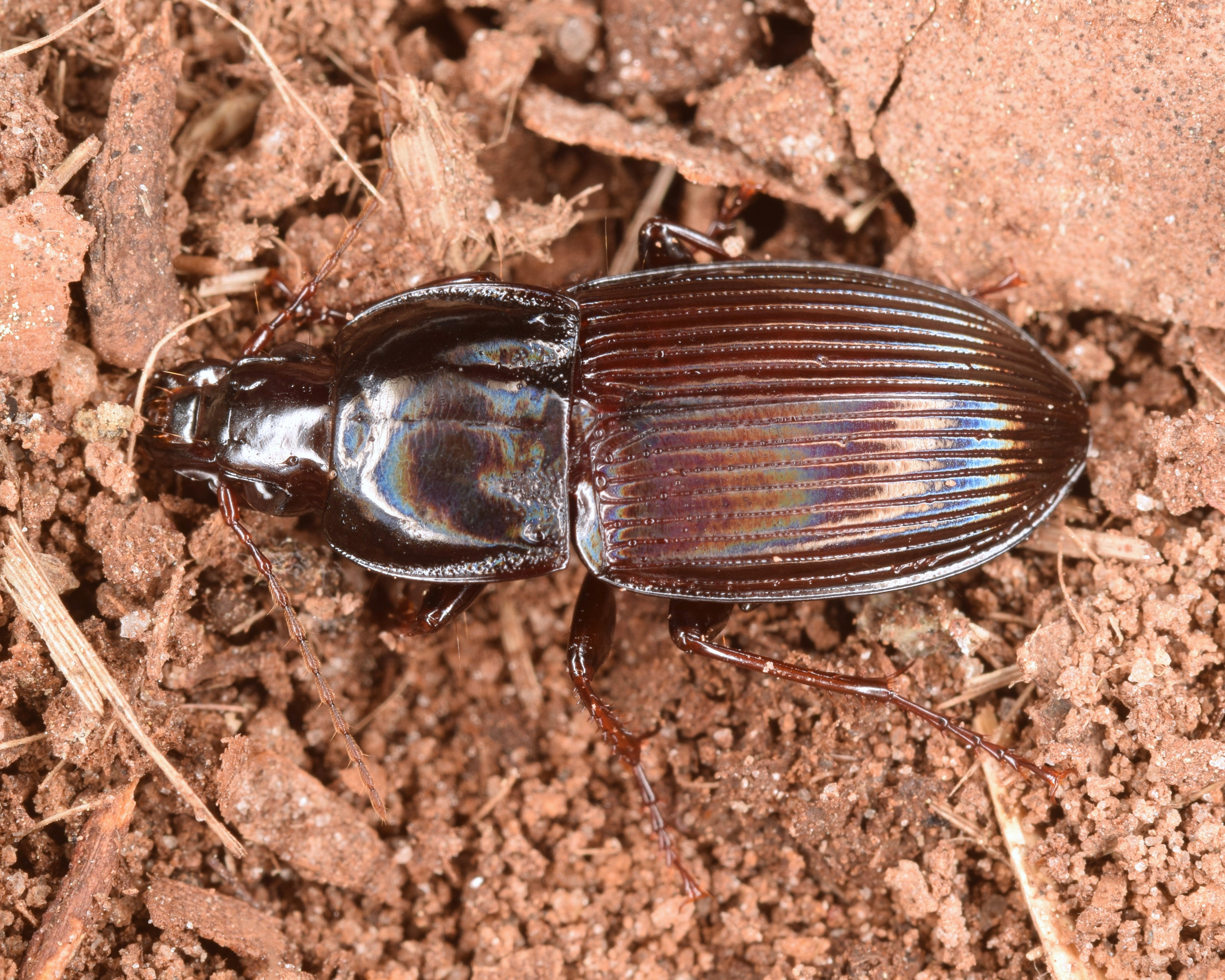
- Unidentified Abacidus species

Scientific classification
- Kingdom: Animalia
- Phylum: Arthropoda
- Class: Insecta
- Order: Coleoptera
- Suborder: Adephaga
- Family: Carabidae
- Subfamily: Pterostichinae
- Genus: Abacidus; LeConte, 1873

= Abacidus =

Genus of beetles

Abacidus is a genus of beetles in the family Carabidae, containing the following species:

- Abacidus atratus (Newman, 1838)
- Abacidus fallax (Dejean, 1828)
- Abacidus hamiltoni (G.horn, 1880)
- Abacidus permundus (Say, 1830)
- Abacidus sculptus (Leconte, 1852)
