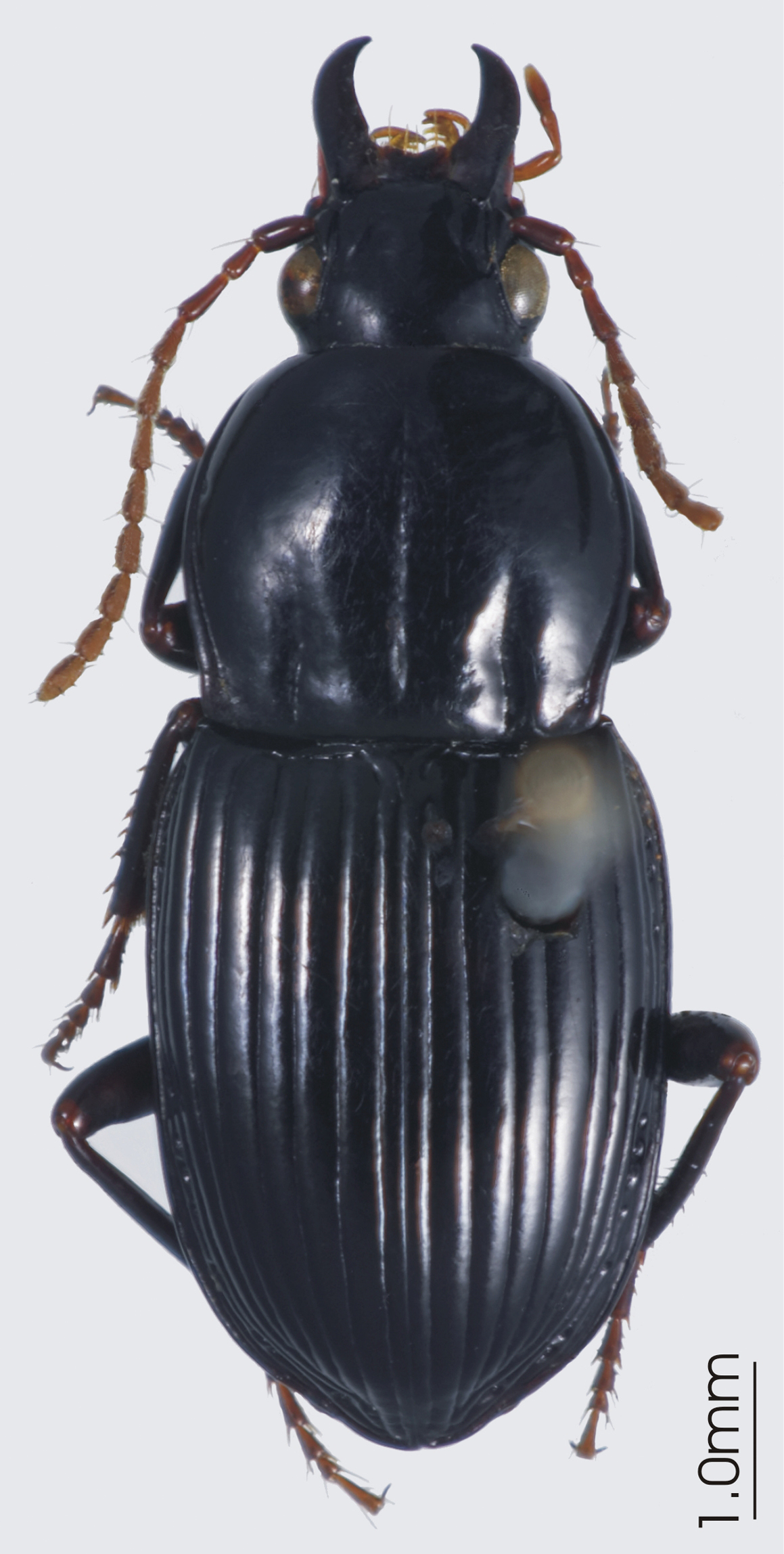
- Habitus image, Setalidius attenuatus, holotype

Scientific classification
- Domain: Eukaryota
- Kingdom: Animalia
- Phylum: Arthropoda
- Class: Insecta
- Order: Coleoptera
- Suborder: Adephaga
- Family: Carabidae
- Subfamily: Pterostichinae
- Tribe: Pterostichini
- Subtribe: Pterostichina
- Genus: Setalidius; Chaudoir, 1878

= Setalidius =

Genus of beetles

Setalidius is a genus in the ground beetle family Carabidae. There are at least two described species in Setalidius, found in New Caledonia.

== Species ==
These two species belong to the genus Setalidius:

- Setalidius attenuatus Fauvel, 1882
- Setalidius nigerrimus Chaudoir, 1878
