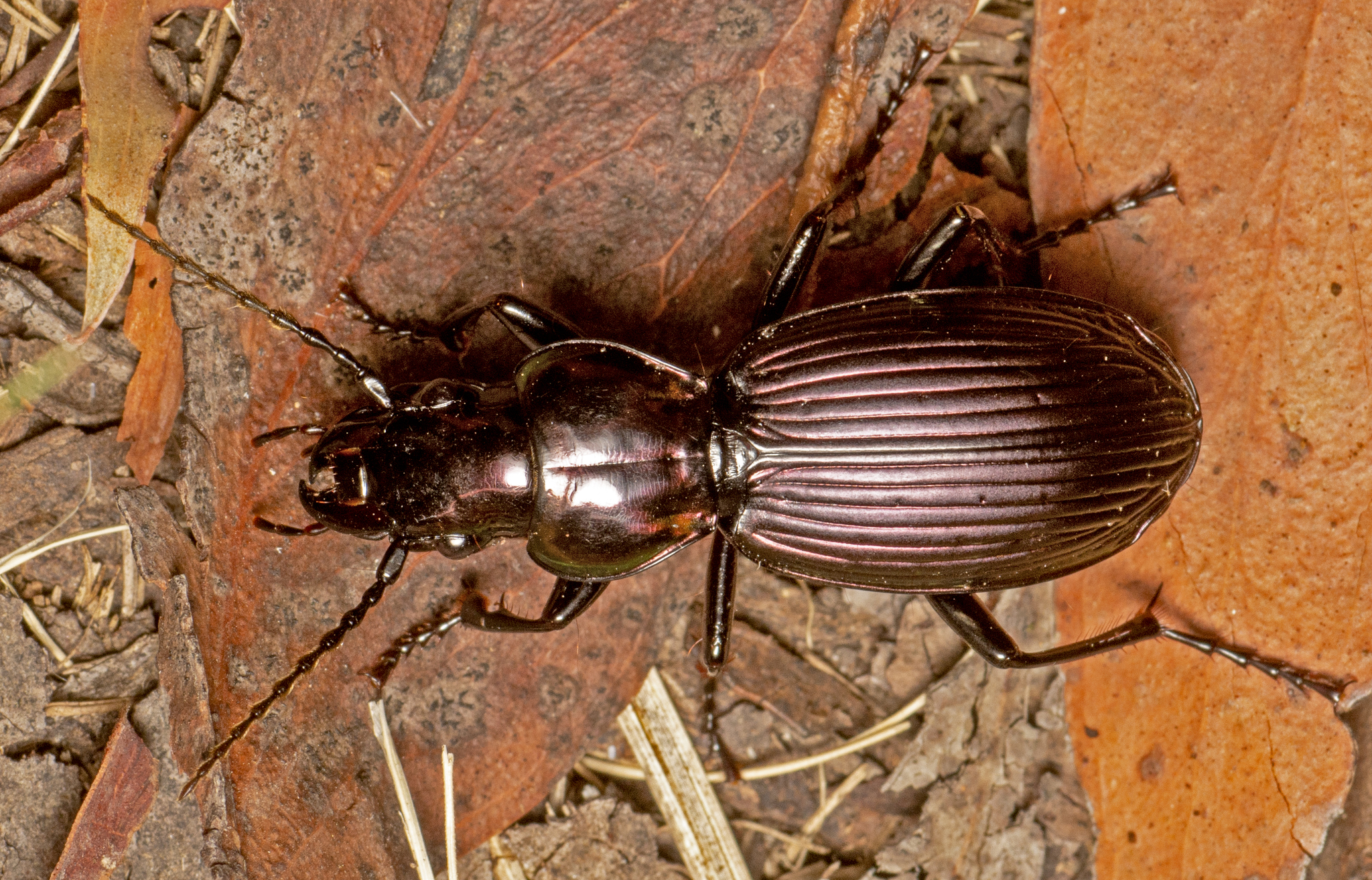
- Cratoferonia phylarchus

Scientific classification
- Domain: Eukaryota
- Kingdom: Animalia
- Phylum: Arthropoda
- Class: Insecta
- Order: Coleoptera
- Suborder: Adephaga
- Family: Carabidae
- Tribe: Pterostichini
- Subtribe: Pterostichina
- Genus: Cratoferonia; Tschitscherine, 1902

= Cratoferonia =

Genus of beetles

Cratoferonia is a genus of beetles in the family Carabidae, containing the following species: The three species in this genus live on the east coast of Australia.

- Cratoferonia daccordii Garetto & Giachino, 2003
- Cratoferonia phylarchus (Sloane, 1900)
- Cratoferonia regalis (Castelnau, 1867)
