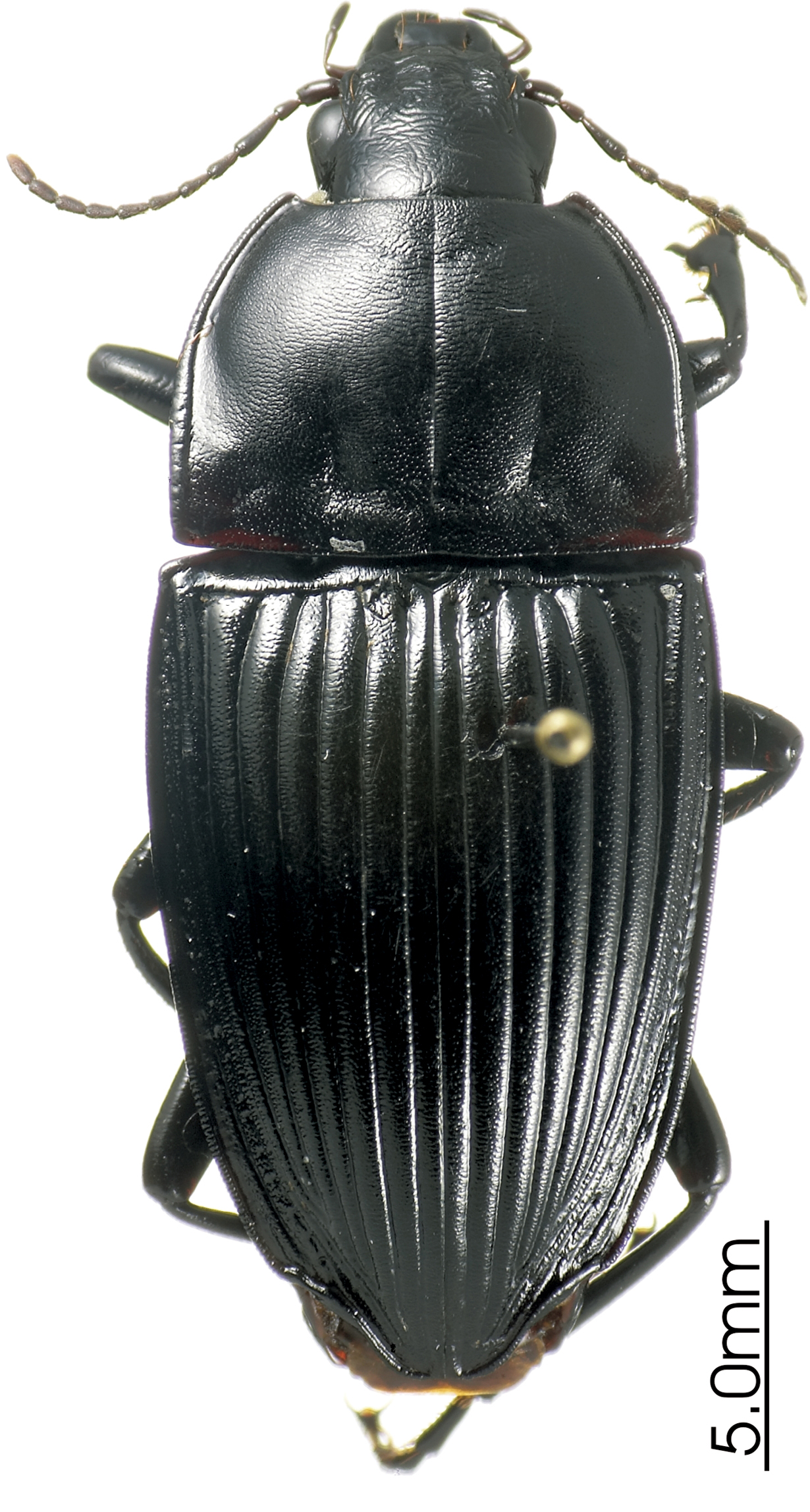

Scientific classification
- Domain: Eukaryota
- Kingdom: Animalia
- Phylum: Arthropoda
- Class: Insecta
- Order: Coleoptera
- Suborder: Adephaga
- Family: Carabidae
- Subfamily: Pterostichinae
- Tribe: Pterostichini
- Subtribe: Pterostichina
- Genus: Euryabax; Fauvel, 1903
- Species: E. colossus

Binomial name
- Euryabax colossus Fauvel, 1903

= Euryabax =

Genus of beetles

Euryabax is a genus in the ground beetle family Carabidae. This genus has a single species, Euryabax colossus. It is found in New Caledonia.
