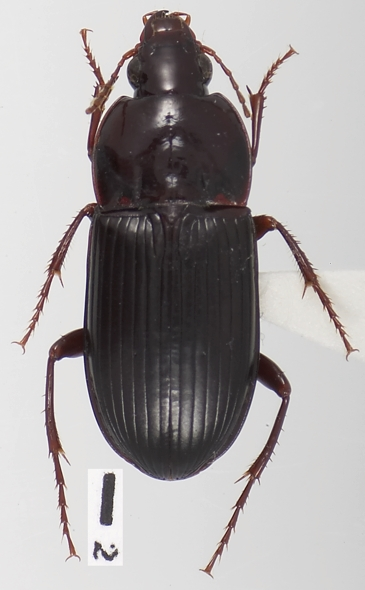
- Orthomus barbarus

Scientific classification
- Domain: Eukaryota
- Kingdom: Animalia
- Phylum: Arthropoda
- Class: Insecta
- Order: Coleoptera
- Suborder: Adephaga
- Family: Carabidae
- Subfamily: Pterostichinae
- Tribe: Pterostichini
- Subtribe: Euchroina
- Genus: Orthomus; Chaudoir, 1838

Subgenera
- Eutrichopus Tschitscherine, 1897; Gietopus Machado, 1992; Nesorthomus Bedel, 1899; Orthomus Chaudoir, 1838; Trichopedius Bedel, 1899; Wolltinerfia Machado, 1985

= Orthomus =

Genus of beetles

Orthomus is a genus of beetles in the family Carabidae. There are more than 30 described species in the genus Orthomus.

== Species ==
These 37 species belong to the genus Orthomus:

- Orthomus abacoides (Lucas, 1846) (Algeria)
- Orthomus achilles Wrase & Jeanne, 2005 (Algeria)
- Orthomus anagae (Medina & Oromi, 1991) (the Canary Islands)
- Orthomus annae (Donabauer, 2008) (Madeira)
- Orthomus aquila (Coquerel, 1859) (Algeria)
- Orthomus aubryi Jeanne, 1974 (Spain)
- Orthomus balearicus (Piochard de la Brûlerie, 1868) (Spain and Baleares)
- Orthomus barbarus (Dejean, 1828) (France, Portugal, Spain, and Baleares)
- Orthomus bedelianus (Lutshnik, 1915) (Madeira)
- Orthomus berrai (F.Battoni, 1987) (Madeira)
- Orthomus berytensis (Reiche & Saulcy, 1855) (Southern Europe, North Africa, Middle East)
- Orthomus canariensis (Brullé, 1839) (the Canary Islands)
- Orthomus curtus (Wollaston, 1854) (Madeira)
- Orthomus dilaticollis (Wollaston, 1854) (Madeira)
- Orthomus dimorphus Antoine, 1933 (Morocco)
- Orthomus discors (Wollaston, 1864) (the Canary Islands)
- Orthomus gonzalezi (Mateu, 1954) (the Canary Islands)
- Orthomus gracilipes (Wollaston, 1854) (Madeira)
- Orthomus hispanicus (Dejean, 1828) (Spain)
- Orthomus lacouri (Antoine, 1941) (Morocco and Algeria)
- Orthomus leprieuri Pic, 1894 (Algeria and Tunisia)
- Orthomus longior Chaudoir, 1874 (Israel, Lebanon, Syria, and Turkey)
- Orthomus longulus (Reiche & Saulcy, 1855) (Israel and Lebanon)
- Orthomus lundbladi Jeannel, 1938 (Madeira)
- Orthomus maroccanus Chaudoir, 1874 (Spain and Morocco)
- Orthomus martini (Machado, 1984) (the Canary Islands)
- Orthomus pecoudi Jeannel, 1943 (Madeira)
- Orthomus perezii (Martinez y Saez, 1873) (Spain)
- Orthomus planidorsis (Fairmaire, 1872) (France and Spain)
- Orthomus poggii Leo & Magrini, 2002 (Sardinia and Italy)
- Orthomus pommereaui (Perris, 1869) (Algeria)
- Orthomus rubicundus (Coquerel, 1859) (Algeria and Tunisia)
- Orthomus starkei Wrase & Jeanne, 2005 (Morocco)
- Orthomus tazekensis (Antoine, 1941) (Morocco)
- Orthomus tenerifae (Machado, 1984) (the Canary Islands)
- Orthomus tobiasi (Donabauer, 2008) (the Canary Islands)
- Orthomus velocissimus (Waltl, 1835) (Portugal and Spain)
