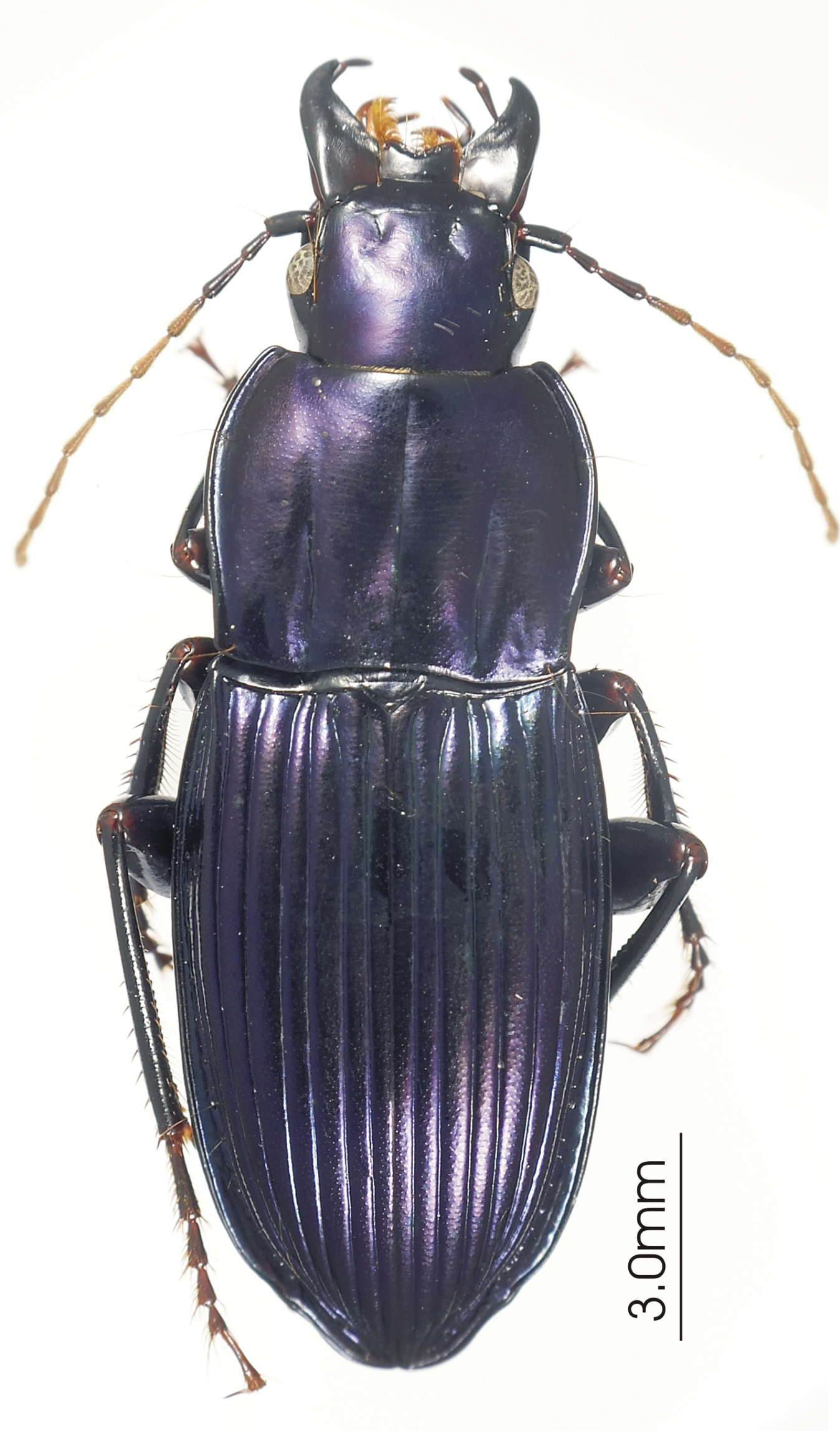
- Abacomorphus caledonicus

Scientific classification
- Kingdom: Animalia
- Phylum: Arthropoda
- Class: Insecta
- Order: Coleoptera
- Suborder: Adephaga
- Family: Carabidae
- Subfamily: Pterostichinae
- Genus: Abacomorphus; Chaudoir, 1878

= Abacomorphus =

Genus of beetles

Abacomorphus is a genus of beetles in the family Carabidae, containing the following species:

- Abacomorphus asperulus Fauvel, 1882
- Abacomorphus caledonicus (Montrouzier, 1860)
