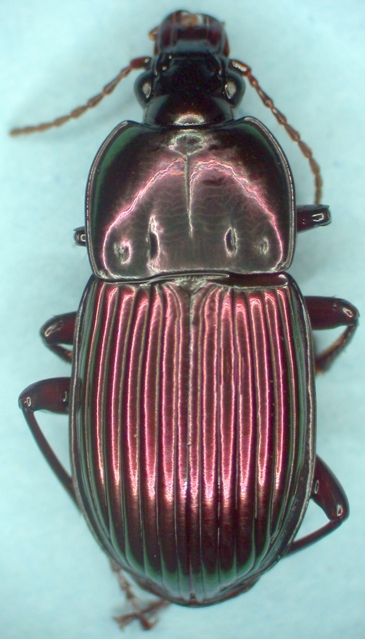
- Euchroa dives

Scientific classification
- Domain: Eukaryota
- Kingdom: Animalia
- Phylum: Arthropoda
- Class: Insecta
- Order: Coleoptera
- Suborder: Adephaga
- Family: Carabidae
- Subfamily: Pterostichinae
- Tribe: Pterostichini
- Subtribe: Euchroina
- Genus: Euchroa; Brullé, 1835

Synonyms
- Dyschromus Chaudoir, 1835

= Euchroa =

Genus of beetles

Euchroa is a genus in the ground beetle family Carabidae. There are more than 30 described species in Euchroa, found mainly in Central and South America, including Caribbean islands.

== Species ==
These 38 species belong to the genus Euchroa:

- Euchroa atoyac Frania & Ball, 2007
- Euchroa carbonera Frania & Ball, 2007
- Euchroa centralis (Darlington, 1939) (Hispaniola)
- Euchroa chrysophana Bates, 1891 (Mexico)
- Euchroa citlaltepetl Frania & Ball, 2007
- Euchroa cuiyachapa Frania & Ball, 2007
- Euchroa cupripennis Chaudoir, 1874 (Hispaniola)
- Euchroa dimidiata Chaudoir, 1874 (Mexico)
- Euchroa dives Tschitscherine, 1898 (Brazil)
- Euchroa filodecaballo Frania & Ball, 2007
- Euchroa flohri Bates, 1882 (Mexico)
- Euchroa harrisoni Frania & Ball, 2007
- Euchroa huautla Frania & Ball, 2007
- Euchroa independencia Frania & Ball, 2007
- Euchroa ixtapa Frania & Ball, 2007
- Euchroa jalisco Frania & Ball, 2007
- Euchroa juchatengo Frania & Ball, 2007
- Euchroa lasvigas Frania & Ball, 2007
- Euchroa miahuatlan Frania & Ball, 2007
- Euchroa nitidicollis Brullé, 1835 (Brazil)
- Euchroa nitidipennis Putzeys, 1845 (Mexico)
- Euchroa nizavaguiti Frania & Ball, 2007
- Euchroa onkonegare Shpeley & Araujo, 1997 (Ecuador)
- Euchroa opaca (Chaudoir, 1835) (Hispaniola)
- Euchroa pedernales Frania & Ball, 2007
- Euchroa perezi (Darlington, 1939) (Hispaniola)
- Euchroa perote Frania & Ball, 2007
- Euchroa puertogallo Frania & Ball, 2007
- Euchroa sallei Chaudoir, 1874 (Mexico)
- Euchroa santacatarina Frania & Ball, 2007
- Euchroa soladevega Frania & Ball, 2007
- Euchroa suchixtepec Frania & Ball, 2007
- Euchroa tenancingo Frania & Ball, 2007
- Euchroa teotitlan Frania & Ball, 2007
- Euchroa tiburonica (Darlington, 1936) (Hispaniola)
- Euchroa yucuyacua Frania & Ball, 2007
- Euchroa zempoaltepetl Frania & Ball, 2007
- Euchroa zongolica Frania & Ball, 2007
