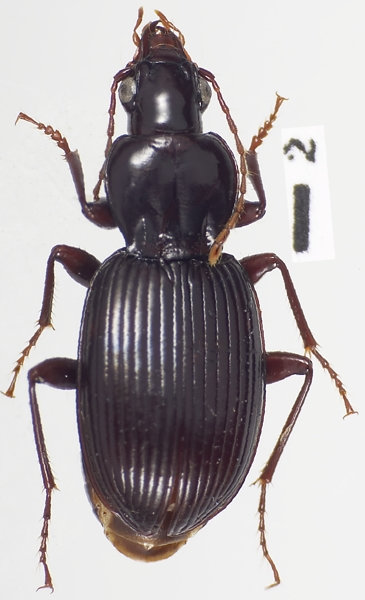
- Gastrellarius honestus

Scientific classification
- Kingdom: Animalia
- Phylum: Arthropoda
- Class: Insecta
- Order: Coleoptera
- Suborder: Adephaga
- Family: Carabidae
- Tribe: Pterostichini
- Genus: Gastrellarius; Casey, 1918

= Gastrellarius =

Genus of beetles

Gastrellarius is a genus of beetles in the family Carabidae, containing the following species:

- Gastrellarius blanchardi (G. Horn, 1891)
- Gastrellarius honestus (Say, 1823)
- Gastrellarius unicarum (Darlington, 1931)
