= Gastrellarius blanchardi =

Scientific classification
- Domain: Eukaryota
- Kingdom: Animalia
- Phylum: Arthropoda
- Class: Insecta
- Order: Coleoptera
- Suborder: Adephaga
- Family: Carabidae
- Genus: Gastrellarius
- Species: G. blanchardi

Binomial name
- Gastrellarius blanchardi (G. Horn, 1891)

Synonyms
- Pterostichus blanchardi G. Horn, 1891

Species of beetle

Gastrellarius blanchardi is a species of woodland ground beetle in the family Carabidae. It is found in North America.
