= Gastrellarius unicarum =

Scientific classification
- Domain: Eukaryota
- Kingdom: Animalia
- Phylum: Arthropoda
- Class: Insecta
- Order: Coleoptera
- Suborder: Adephaga
- Family: Carabidae
- Genus: Gastrellarius
- Species: G. unicarum

Binomial name
- Gastrellarius unicarum (Darlington, 1932)

Synonyms
- Pterostichus unicarum Darlington, 1932

Species of beetle

Gastrellarius unicarum is a species of woodland ground beetle in the family Carabidae. It is found in North America.
