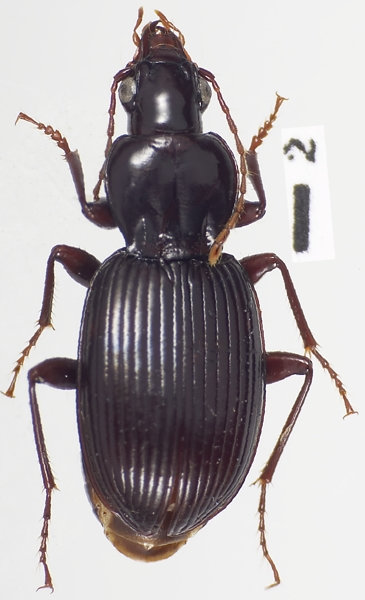

Scientific classification
- Domain: Eukaryota
- Kingdom: Animalia
- Phylum: Arthropoda
- Class: Insecta
- Order: Coleoptera
- Suborder: Adephaga
- Family: Carabidae
- Genus: Gastrellarius
- Species: G. honestus

Binomial name
- Gastrellarius honestus (Say, 1823)

= Gastrellarius honestus =

Species of beetle

Gastrellarius honestus is a species of woodland ground beetle in the family Carabidae. It is found in North America.
