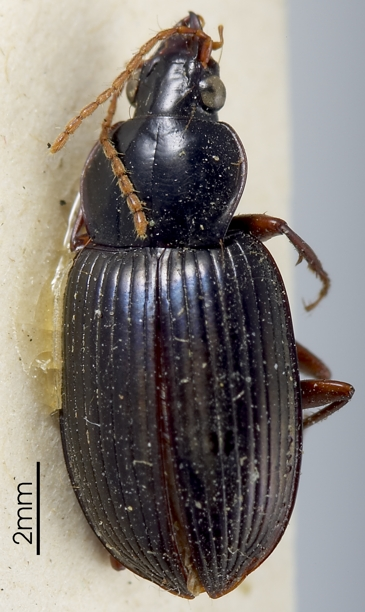

Scientific classification
- Kingdom: Animalia
- Phylum: Arthropoda
- Clade: Pancrustacea
- Class: Insecta
- Order: Coleoptera
- Suborder: Adephaga
- Family: Carabidae
- Genus: Metabacetus
- Species: M. immarginatus

Binomial name
- Metabacetus immarginatus Bates, 1892

= Metabacetus immarginatus =

Species of beetle

Metabacetus immarginatus is a species of beetle in the family Carabidae. It is found in India and Myanmar.
