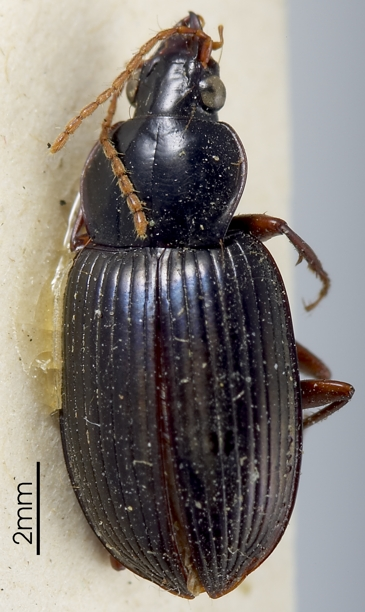
- Metabacetus immarginatus

Scientific classification
- Kingdom: Animalia
- Phylum: Arthropoda
- Class: Insecta
- Order: Coleoptera
- Suborder: Adephaga
- Family: Carabidae
- Subfamily: Pterostichinae
- Tribe: Pterostichini
- Subtribe: Abacetina
- Genus: Metabacetus; Bates, 1892

= Metabacetus =

Genus of beetles

Metabacetus is a genus in the beetle family Carabidae. There are about eight described species in Metabacetus.

== Species ==
These eight species belong to the genus Metabacetus:

- Metabacetus arrowi Straneo, 1938 (Philippines)
- Metabacetus hermani Will & Park, 2008 (Vietnam)
- Metabacetus immarginatus Bates, 1892 (India and Myanmar)
- Metabacetus jeanneli Straneo, 1938 (Malaysia, Indonesia, and Borneo)
- Metabacetus laotinus Straneo, 1938 (Laos)
- Metabacetus perakianus Straneo, 1938 (Malaysia)
- Metabacetus vandoesburgi Straneo, 1948 (Indonesia and Borneo)
- Metabacetus willi Guéorguiev, 2013 (Indonesia)
