= Metabacetus vandoesburgi =

Scientific classification
- Kingdom: Animalia
- Phylum: Arthropoda
- Clade: Pancrustacea
- Class: Insecta
- Order: Coleoptera
- Suborder: Adephaga
- Family: Carabidae
- Genus: Metabacetus
- Species: M. vandoesburgi

Binomial name
- Metabacetus vandoesburgi Straneo, 1948

Species of beetle

Metabacetus vendoesburgi is a species of beetle in the family Carabidae. It is found in Malaysia.
