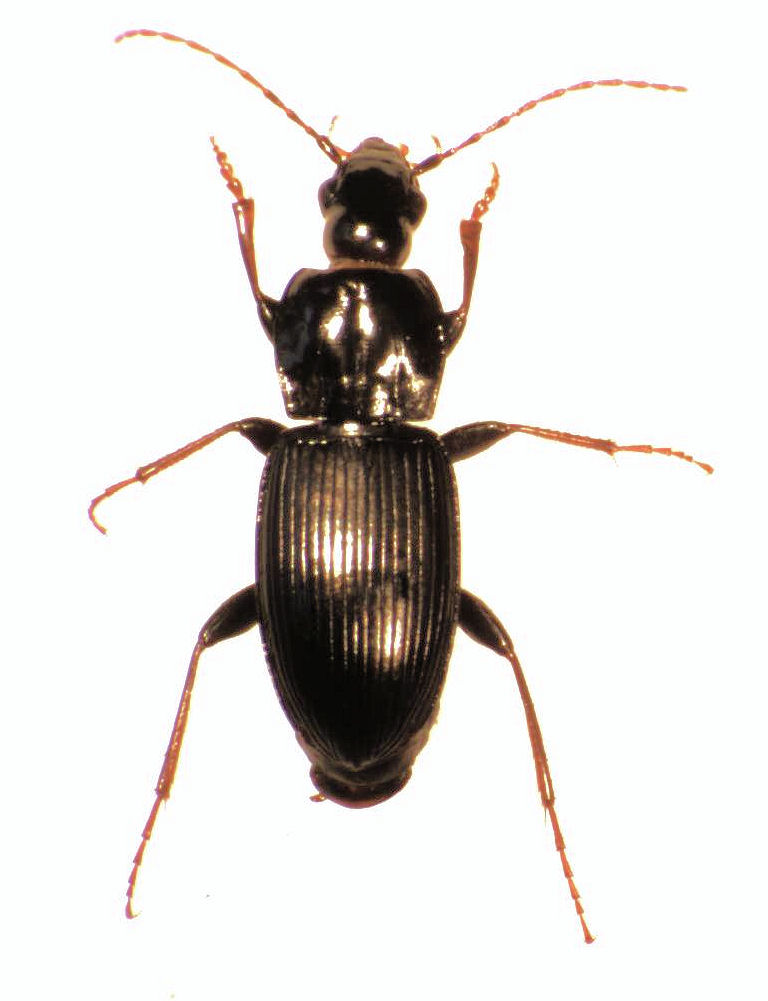
- Aulacopodus calathoides

Scientific classification
- Kingdom: Animalia
- Phylum: Arthropoda
- Class: Insecta
- Order: Coleoptera
- Suborder: Adephaga
- Family: Carabidae
- Subfamily: Pterostichinae
- Genus: Aulacopodus; Britton, 1940

= Aulacopodus =

Genus of beetles

Aulacopodus is a genus of beetles in the family Carabidae, containing the following species:

- Aulacopodus brouni (Csiki 1930)
- Aulacopodus calathoides (Broun 1886)
- Aulacopodus maorinus (Bates 1874)
- Aulacopodus sharpianus (Broun 1893)
