= Cophosomorpha =

Scientific classification
- Domain: Eukaryota
- Kingdom: Animalia
- Phylum: Arthropoda
- Class: Insecta
- Order: Coleoptera
- Suborder: Adephaga
- Family: Carabidae
- Subfamily: Pterostichinae
- Tribe: Pterostichini
- Subtribe: Pterostichina
- Genus: Cophosomorpha; Tschitscherine, 1891

Synonyms
- Cophosomorphus Péringuey, 1896; Macquena Péringuey, 1926; Mosuta Péringuey, 1926

Genus of beetles

Cophosomorpha is a genus in the ground beetle family Carabidae. There are more than 40 described species in Cophosomorpha, found in South Africa.

== Species ==
These 41 species belong to the genus Cophosomorpha:

- Cophosomorpha agilis Straneo, 1995
- Cophosomorpha alticola (Péringuey, 1898)
- Cophosomorpha anceyi (Tschitscherine, 1891)
- Cophosomorpha angulicollis Straneo, 1943
- Cophosomorpha angustibasis Straneo, 1955
- Cophosomorpha angustula Straneo, 1940
- Cophosomorpha arnoldi Straneo, 1940
- Cophosomorpha basilewskyi Straneo, 1975
- Cophosomorpha brincki Straneo, 1958
- Cophosomorpha brittoni Straneo, 1940
- Cophosomorpha caffra (Dejean, 1828)
- Cophosomorpha capicola (Tschitscherine, 1891)
- Cophosomorpha castelli (Péringuey, 1926)
- Cophosomorpha congenera (Péringuey, 1898)
- Cophosomorpha congruens (Péringuey, 1896)
- Cophosomorpha crenicollis Straneo, 1986
- Cophosomorpha dichroa (Tschitscherine, 1891)
- Cophosomorpha endroedyi Straneo, 1986
- Cophosomorpha fallaciosa (Tschitscherine, 1899)
- Cophosomorpha femoralis Straneo, 1995
- Cophosomorpha hessei Straneo, 1958
- Cophosomorpha impunctata Straneo, 1975
- Cophosomorpha laetans Péringuey, 1926
- Cophosomorpha leleupiana Straneo, 1965
- Cophosomorpha longelytrata Straneo, 1940
- Cophosomorpha longula Straneo, 1951
- Cophosomorpha loveridgei Straneo, 1951
- Cophosomorpha macroptera (Péringuey, 1898)
- Cophosomorpha minuta Straneo, 1958
- Cophosomorpha natalensis (Boheman, 1848)
- Cophosomorpha propinqua Péringuey, 1926
- Cophosomorpha pseudocastelli Straneo, 1958
- Cophosomorpha pseudodichroa Péringuey, 1926
- Cophosomorpha recticollis Straneo, 1940
- Cophosomorpha rufina Straneo, 1940
- Cophosomorpha sagittalis Straneo, 1940
- Cophosomorpha similis Straneo, 1949
- Cophosomorpha sinuatangula (Tschitscherine, 1901)
- Cophosomorpha soror (Tschitscherine, 1891)
- Cophosomorpha sublaetans Straneo, 1965
- Cophosomorpha vansoni Straneo, 1940
