= Cyrtomoscelis =

Scientific classification
- Domain: Eukaryota
- Kingdom: Animalia
- Phylum: Arthropoda
- Class: Insecta
- Order: Coleoptera
- Suborder: Adephaga
- Family: Carabidae
- Subfamily: Pterostichinae
- Tribe: Pterostichini
- Subtribe: Abacetina
- Genus: Cyrtomoscelis; Chaudoir, 1874

Synonyms
- Berea Péringuey, 1926; Cyrtotelus Tschitscherine, 1902

Genus of beetles

Cyrtomoscelis is a genus in the ground beetle family Carabidae. There are more than 20 described species in Cyrtomoscelis, found in South Africa.

== Species ==
These 21 species belong to the genus Cyrtomoscelis:

- Cyrtomoscelis abacetoides (Straneo, 1958)
- Cyrtomoscelis ambigua (Straneo, 1965)
- Cyrtomoscelis bangenia Straneo, 1995
- Cyrtomoscelis caffra (Péringuey, 1926)
- Cyrtomoscelis dwesana Straneo, 1991
- Cyrtomoscelis elongata (Straneo, 1939)
- Cyrtomoscelis ferruginea (Boheman, 1848)
- Cyrtomoscelis ferruginoides (Straneo, 1938)
- Cyrtomoscelis humicola (Straneo, 1965)
- Cyrtomoscelis inflata (Straneo, 1958)
- Cyrtomoscelis leonardii Straneo, 1991
- Cyrtomoscelis longistria Straneo, 1986
- Cyrtomoscelis major (Straneo, 1939)
- Cyrtomoscelis minima (Straneo, 1946)
- Cyrtomoscelis natalensis Chaudoir, 1874
- Cyrtomoscelis ovalipennis Straneo, 1991
- Cyrtomoscelis pauper (Straneo, 1965)
- Cyrtomoscelis piriensis (Straneo, 1965)
- Cyrtomoscelis rotundicollis (Straneo, 1965)
- Cyrtomoscelis silvicola Straneo, 1991
- Cyrtomoscelis trivialis (Boheman, 1848)
