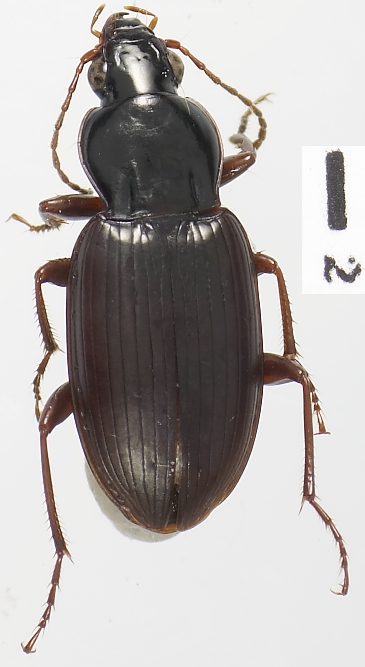
- Argutoridius chilensis

Scientific classification
- Kingdom: Animalia
- Phylum: Arthropoda
- Class: Insecta
- Order: Coleoptera
- Suborder: Adephaga
- Family: Carabidae
- Subfamily: Pterostichinae
- Genus: Argutoridius; Chaudoir, 1876

= Argutoridius =

Genus of beetles

Argutoridius is a genus of beetles in the family Carabidae, containing the following species:

- Argutoridius abacetoides (Chaudoir, 1876)
- Argutoridius bonariensis (Dejean, 1831)
- Argutoridius chilensis (Dejean, 1828)
- Argutoridius cubensis (Darlington, 1937)
- Argutoridius depressulus Straneo, 1969
- Argutoridius oblitus (Dejean, 1831)
- Argutoridius pavens (Tschitscherine, 1900)
- Argutoridius uruguayicus (Chaudoir, 1876)
- Argutoridius zischkai Straneo, 1969
