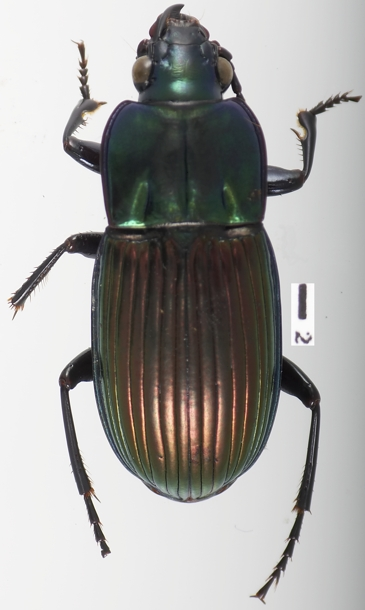
- Meropalpus nobilis

Scientific classification
- Domain: Eukaryota
- Kingdom: Animalia
- Phylum: Arthropoda
- Class: Insecta
- Order: Coleoptera
- Suborder: Adephaga
- Family: Carabidae
- Subfamily: Pterostichinae
- Tribe: Pterostichini
- Subtribe: Euchroina
- Genus: Meropalpus; Tschitscherine, 1900

= Meropalpus =

Genus of beetles

Meropalpus is a genus in the ground beetle family Carabidae. There are at least three described species in Meropalpus, found in South America.

== Species ==
These three species belong to the genus Meropalpus:

- Meropalpus azurescens Straneo, 1943 (Brazil)
- Meropalpus irradians Tschitscherine, 1900 (Brazil)
- Meropalpus nobilis (Brullé, 1843) (Bolivia)
