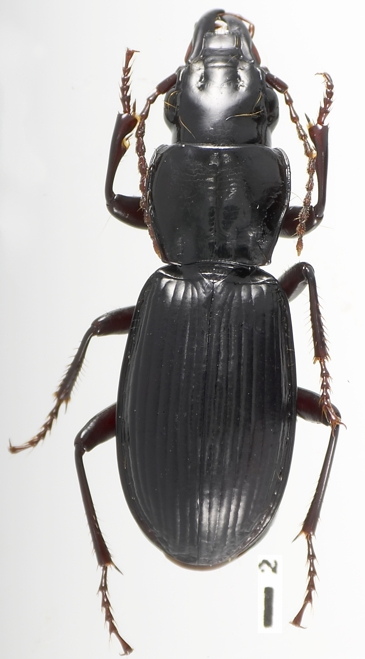
- Percolaus guillermo

Scientific classification
- Domain: Eukaryota
- Kingdom: Animalia
- Phylum: Arthropoda
- Class: Insecta
- Order: Coleoptera
- Suborder: Adephaga
- Family: Carabidae
- Subfamily: Pterostichinae
- Tribe: Pterostichini
- Subtribe: Pterostichina
- Genus: Percolaus; Bates, 1882

= Percolaus =

Genus of beetles

Percolaus is a genus in the ground beetle family Carabidae. There are at least two described species in Percolaus.

== Species ==
These two species belong to the genus Percolaus:

- Percolaus championi Bates, 1882 (Guatemala)
- Percolaus guillermo (Ball & Roughley, 1982) (Mexico)
