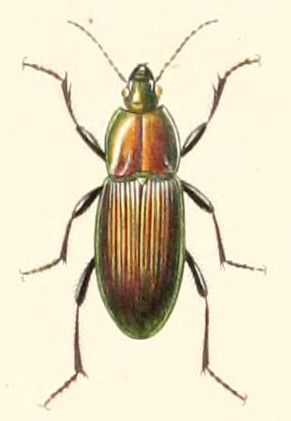
- Cynthidia

Scientific classification
- Domain: Eukaryota
- Kingdom: Animalia
- Phylum: Arthropoda
- Class: Insecta
- Order: Coleoptera
- Suborder: Adephaga
- Family: Carabidae
- Subfamily: Pterostichinae
- Tribe: Pterostichini
- Subtribe: Euchroina
- Genus: Cynthidia; Chaudoir, 1874

= Cynthidia =

Genus of beetles

Cynthidia is a genus in the ground beetle family Carabidae. There are about six described species in Cynthidia, found in South America.

== Species ==
These six species belong to the genus Cynthidia:

- Cynthidia cancellata (Brullé, 1843) (Argentina)
- Cynthidia croceipes (Perty, 1830) (Brazil)
- Cynthidia foveata Chaudoir, 1874 (Brazil)
- Cynthidia majorina Straneo, 1951 (Paraguay and Brazil)
- Cynthidia octocoela Chaudoir, 1874 (Brazil)
- Cynthidia planodiscus (Perty, 1830) (Argentina, Uruguay, and Brazil)
