= Parhypates =

Scientific classification
- Kingdom: Animalia
- Phylum: Arthropoda
- Class: Insecta
- Order: Coleoptera
- Suborder: Adephaga
- Family: Carabidae
- Subfamily: Pterostichinae
- Tribe: Pterostichini
- Subtribe: Pterostichina
- Genus: Parhypates; Motschulsky, 1866

Genus of beetles

Parhypates is a genus in the beetle family Carabidae. There are about 13 described species in Parhypates, found in South America.

== Species ==
These 13 species belong to the genus Parhypates:

- Parhypates arctus (Tschitscherine, 1900) (Chile)
- Parhypates bonellii (G.R.Waterhouse, 1841) (Chile)
- Parhypates chalybicolor (Chaudoir, 1835) (Chile)
- Parhypates cordicollis (Dejean, 1828) (Argentina, Uruguay, and Brazil)
- Parhypates extenuatus (Tschitscherine, 1900) (Chile)
- Parhypates herberti Straneo, 1987 (Peru)
- Parhypates irrequietus (Lutshnik, 1931) (Chile)
- Parhypates melaenus (Chaudoir, 1876) (Chile)
- Parhypates nunni Straneo, 1987 (Chile)
- Parhypates rufipalpis (Curtis, 1838) (Chile)
- Parhypates sinuatipennis (Fairmaire, 1860) (Chile)
- Parhypates stenomus (Chaudoir, 1876) (Chile)
- Parhypates tenuestriatus Motschulsky, 1866 (Chile)
