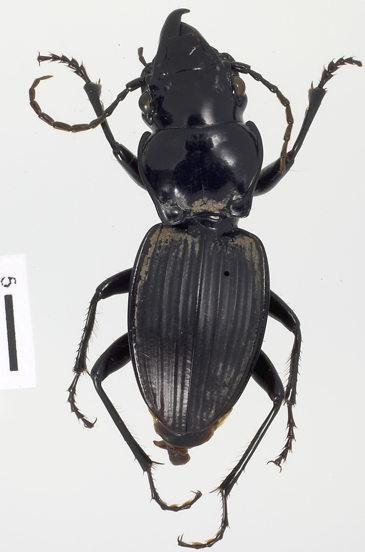
- Paranurus macleayi

Scientific classification
- Domain: Eukaryota
- Kingdom: Animalia
- Phylum: Arthropoda
- Class: Insecta
- Order: Coleoptera
- Suborder: Adephaga
- Family: Carabidae
- Subfamily: Pterostichinae
- Tribe: Pterostichini
- Subtribe: Pterostichina
- Genus: Paranurus; Tschitscherine, 1901

= Paranurus =

Genus of beetles

Paranurus is a genus in the ground beetle family Carabidae. There are at least three described species in Paranurus, found in Australia.

== Species ==
These three species belong to the genus Paranurus:

- Paranurus dilaticeps (Chaudoir, 1865)
- Paranurus macleayi (Sloane, 1895)
- Paranurus petri Tschitscherine, 1901
