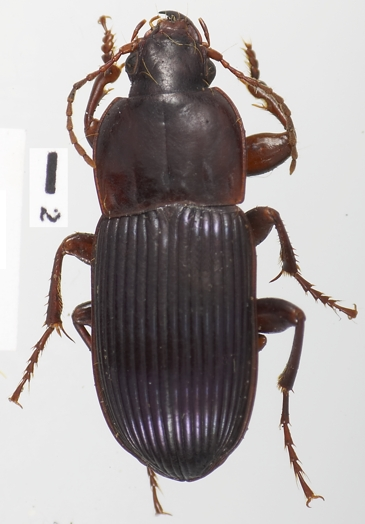
- Haplobothynus gounellei

Scientific classification
- Domain: Eukaryota
- Kingdom: Animalia
- Phylum: Arthropoda
- Class: Insecta
- Order: Coleoptera
- Suborder: Adephaga
- Family: Carabidae
- Subfamily: Pterostichinae
- Tribe: Pterostichini
- Subtribe: Euchroina
- Genus: Haplobothynus; Tschitscherine, 1901

= Haplobothynus =

Genus of beetles

Haplobothynus is a genus of carabids in the beetle family Carabidae. There are at least two described species in Haplobothynus, found in Brazil.

== Species ==
These two species belong to the genus Haplobothynus:

- Haplobothynus gounellei Tschitscherine, 1901
- Haplobothynus paranae Tschitscherine, 1901
