= Straneostichus =

Scientific classification
- Domain: Eukaryota
- Kingdom: Animalia
- Phylum: Arthropoda
- Class: Insecta
- Order: Coleoptera
- Suborder: Adephaga
- Family: Carabidae
- Subfamily: Pterostichinae
- Tribe: Pterostichini
- Subtribe: Pterostichina
- Genus: Straneostichus; Sciaky, 1994

Genus of beetles

Straneostichus is a genus in the ground beetle family Carabidae. There are about 11 described species in Straneostichus, found in China.

== Species ==
These 11 species belong to the genus Straneostichus:

- Straneostichus farkaci Sciaky, 1996
- Straneostichus fischeri Sciaky, 1994
- Straneostichus ganqingensis Chen, Shi & Liang, 2022
- Straneostichus haeckeli Sciaky & Wrase, 1997
- Straneostichus kirschenhoferi Sciaky, 1994
- Straneostichus liupanensis Chen, Shi & Liang, 2022
- Straneostichus ovipennis Sciaky, 1994
- Straneostichus politus Chen, Shi & Liang, 2022
- Straneostichus puetzi Sciaky & Wrase, 1997
- Straneostichus rotundatus (Yu, 1992)
- Straneostichus vignai Sciaky, 1994
