= Chalcochrous =

Scientific classification
- Domain: Eukaryota
- Kingdom: Animalia
- Phylum: Arthropoda
- Class: Insecta
- Order: Coleoptera
- Suborder: Adephaga
- Family: Carabidae
- Subfamily: Pterostichinae
- Tribe: Pterostichini
- Subtribe: Pterostichina
- Genus: Chalcochrous; Chaudoir, 1838

Synonyms
- Chalcochroma Péringuey, 1926; Steropomorpha Tschitscherine, 1891; Steropomorphus Péringuey, 1896

Genus of beetles

Chalcochrous is a genus in the ground beetle family Carabidae. There are about six described species in Chalcochrous, found in South Africa.

== Species ==
These six species belong to the genus Chalcochrous:

- Chalcochrous brevithorax Straneo, 1995
- Chalcochrous degener (Péringuey, 1896)
- Chalcochrous hera (Tschitscherine, 1901)
- Chalcochrous lenis (Germar, 1823)
- Chalcochrous otiosus (Tschitscherine, 1898)
- Chalcochrous strictibasis Straneo, 1975
