= Ophonichius =

Scientific classification
- Kingdom: Animalia
- Phylum: Arthropoda
- Class: Insecta
- Order: Coleoptera
- Suborder: Adephaga
- Family: Carabidae
- Subfamily: Pterostichinae
- Tribe: Pterostichini
- Subtribe: Abacetina
- Genus: Ophonichius; Straneo, 1942

Genus of beetles

Ophonichius is a genus in the ground beetle family Carabidae. There are at least three described species in Ophonichius, found in Africa.

== Species ==
These three species belong to the genus Ophonichius:

- Ophonichius gerardi (Burgeon, 1935) (DR Congo, Kenya, Tanzania)
- Ophonichius giaquintoi (Straneo, 1949) (Ethiopia)
- Ophonichius gigas (Straneo, 1949) (Sudan, Kenya)
