= Pioprosopus =

Scientific classification
- Domain: Eukaryota
- Kingdom: Animalia
- Phylum: Arthropoda
- Class: Insecta
- Order: Coleoptera
- Suborder: Adephaga
- Family: Carabidae
- Subfamily: Pterostichinae
- Tribe: Pterostichini
- Subtribe: Abacetina
- Genus: Pioprosopus; Tschitscherine, 1899

Genus of beetles

Pioprosopus is a genus of beetles in the family Carabidae, found in Madagascar.

- Pioprosopus aemulus Tschitscherine, 1902
- Pioprosopus bottoi Straneo, 1959
- Pioprosopus discrepans Tschitscherine, 1902
- Pioprosopus milloti Jeannel, 1948
- Pioprosopus morio Tschitscherine, 1899
