= Setalis =

Scientific classification
- Domain: Eukaryota
- Kingdom: Animalia
- Phylum: Arthropoda
- Class: Insecta
- Order: Coleoptera
- Suborder: Adephaga
- Family: Carabidae
- Subfamily: Pterostichinae
- Tribe: Pterostichini
- Subtribe: Euchroina
- Genus: Setalis; Laporte, 1867

Synonyms
- Loxogmus Sloane, 1890

Genus of beetles

Setalis is a genus in the ground beetle family Carabidae. There are at least three described species in Setalis, found in Australia.

== Species ==
These three species belong to the genus Setalis:

- Setalis niger Laporte, 1867
- Setalis rubripes Sloane, 1907
- Setalis sloanei Darlington, 1953
