= Lobobrachus =

Scientific classification
- Kingdom: Animalia
- Phylum: Arthropoda
- Class: Insecta
- Order: Coleoptera
- Suborder: Adephaga
- Family: Carabidae
- Subfamily: Pterostichinae
- Tribe: Pterostichini
- Subtribe: Euchroina
- Genus: Lobobrachus; Sharp, 1885

Genus of beetles

Lobobrachus is a genus in the beetle family Carabidae. There are at least three described species in Lobobrachus, found in Brazil.

== Species ==
These three species belong to the genus Lobobrachus:

- Lobobrachus alternans Tschitscherine, 1901
- Lobobrachus cleidecostae Campaner & Will, 2020
- Lobobrachus lacerdae Sharp, 1885
