= Pseudabacetus =

Scientific classification
- Kingdom: Animalia
- Phylum: Arthropoda
- Class: Insecta
- Order: Coleoptera
- Suborder: Adephaga
- Family: Carabidae
- Subfamily: Pterostichinae
- Tribe: Pterostichini
- Subtribe: Abacetina
- Genus: Pseudabacetus; Burgeon, 1935

Genus of beetles

Pseudabacetus is a genus in the ground beetle family Carabidae. There are at least two described species in Pseudabacetus.

== Species ==
These two species belong to the genus Pseudabacetus:

- Pseudabacetus parallelus Straneo, 1954 (DR Congo)
- Pseudabacetus securipalpis Burgeon, 1935 (DR Congo)
