= Haptoderodes =

Scientific classification
- Kingdom: Animalia
- Phylum: Arthropoda
- Class: Insecta
- Order: Coleoptera
- Suborder: Adephaga
- Family: Carabidae
- Subfamily: Pterostichinae
- Tribe: Pterostichini
- Subtribe: Abacetina
- Genus: Haptoderodes; Straneo, 1986

Genus of beetles

Haptoderodes is a genus of carabids in the beetle family Carabidae. There are at least two described species in Haptoderodes, found in Africa.

== Species ==
These two species belong to the genus Haptoderodes:

- Haptoderodes convexus Straneo, 1986 (Namibia)
- Haptoderodes planulus Straneo, 1986 (South Africa)
