= Eurystomis =

Scientific classification
- Domain: Eukaryota
- Kingdom: Animalia
- Phylum: Arthropoda
- Class: Insecta
- Order: Coleoptera
- Suborder: Adephaga
- Family: Carabidae
- Subfamily: Pterostichinae
- Tribe: Pterostichini
- Subtribe: Pterostichina
- Genus: Eurystomis; Chaudoir, 1878
- Species: E. castelnaui

Binomial name
- Eurystomis castelnaui Chaudoir, 1878

Genus of beetles

Eurystomis is a genus in the ground beetle family Carabidae. This genus has a single species, Eurystomis castelnaui. It is found in Australia.
