= Rhabdotus =

Scientific classification
- Domain: Eukaryota
- Kingdom: Animalia
- Phylum: Arthropoda
- Class: Insecta
- Order: Coleoptera
- Suborder: Adephaga
- Family: Carabidae
- Tribe: Pterostichini
- Subtribe: Pterostichina
- Genus: Rhabdotus; Chaudoir, 1865
- Species: R. reflexus

Binomial name
- Rhabdotus reflexus (Chaudoir, 1865)

Genus of beetles

Rhabdotus is a genus in the ground beetle family Carabidae. This genus has a single species, Rhabdotus reflexus. It is found in Australia.
