= Liopasa =

Scientific classification
- Domain: Eukaryota
- Kingdom: Animalia
- Phylum: Arthropoda
- Class: Insecta
- Order: Coleoptera
- Suborder: Adephaga
- Family: Carabidae
- Tribe: Pterostichini
- Subtribe: Pterostichina
- Genus: Liopasa; Tschitscherine, 1901
- Species: L. crepera

Binomial name
- Liopasa crepera Tschitscherine, 1901

Genus of beetles

Liopasa is a genus in the ground beetle family Carabidae. This genus has a single species, Liopasa crepera. It is found in Australia.
