= Metaxellus =

Scientific classification
- Kingdom: Animalia
- Phylum: Arthropoda
- Class: Insecta
- Order: Coleoptera
- Suborder: Adephaga
- Family: Carabidae
- Tribe: Pterostichini
- Subtribe: Abacetina
- Genus: Metaxellus; Straneo, 1960
- Species: M. abacetoides

Binomial name
- Metaxellus abacetoides Straneo, 1960

Genus of beetles

Metaxellus is a genus in the ground beetle family Carabidae. This genus has a single species, Metaxellus abacetoides. It is found in Tanzania.
