= Pterostillichus =

Scientific classification
- Kingdom: Animalia
- Phylum: Arthropoda
- Class: Insecta
- Order: Coleoptera
- Suborder: Adephaga
- Family: Carabidae
- Tribe: Pterostichini
- Subtribe: Abacetina
- Genus: Pterostillichus; Straneo, 1949
- Species: P. caecus

Binomial name
- Pterostillichus caecus Straneo, 1949

Genus of beetles

Pterostillichus is a genus in the ground beetle family Carabidae. This genus has a single species, Pterostillichus caecus. It is found in Kenya.
