= Apsaustodon =

Apsaustodon segregatus

Scientific classification
- Kingdom: Animalia
- Phylum: Arthropoda
- Class: Insecta
- Order: Coleoptera
- Suborder: Adephaga
- Family: Carabidae
- Subfamily: Pterostichinae
- Genus: Apsaustodon; Tschitscherine, 1901
- Species: A. segregatus

Binomial name
- Apsaustodon segregatus Tschitscherine, 1901

Genus of beetles

Apsaustodon segregatus is a species of beetle in the family Carabidae, the only species in the genus Apsaustodon.
