= Abacillius =

Scientific classification
- Kingdom: Animalia
- Phylum: Arthropoda
- Class: Insecta
- Order: Coleoptera
- Suborder: Adephaga
- Family: Carabidae
- Subfamily: Pterostichinae
- Genus: Abacillius; Straneo, 1949

Genus of beetles

Abacillius is a genus of beetles in the family Carabidae, containing the following species:

- Abacillius aculeatus (Peringuey, 1896)
- Abacillius basilewskyi Straneo, 1962
