= Teropha =

Scientific classification
- Kingdom: Animalia
- Phylum: Arthropoda
- Class: Insecta
- Order: Coleoptera
- Suborder: Adephaga
- Family: Carabidae
- Subfamily: Pterostichinae
- Genus: Teropha; Castelnau, 1867

Genus of beetles

Teropha is a genus of beetles in the family Carabidae, containing the following species:

- Teropha besti (Sloane, 1902) (Australia)
- Teropha sturtii (White, 1859) (Australia)
