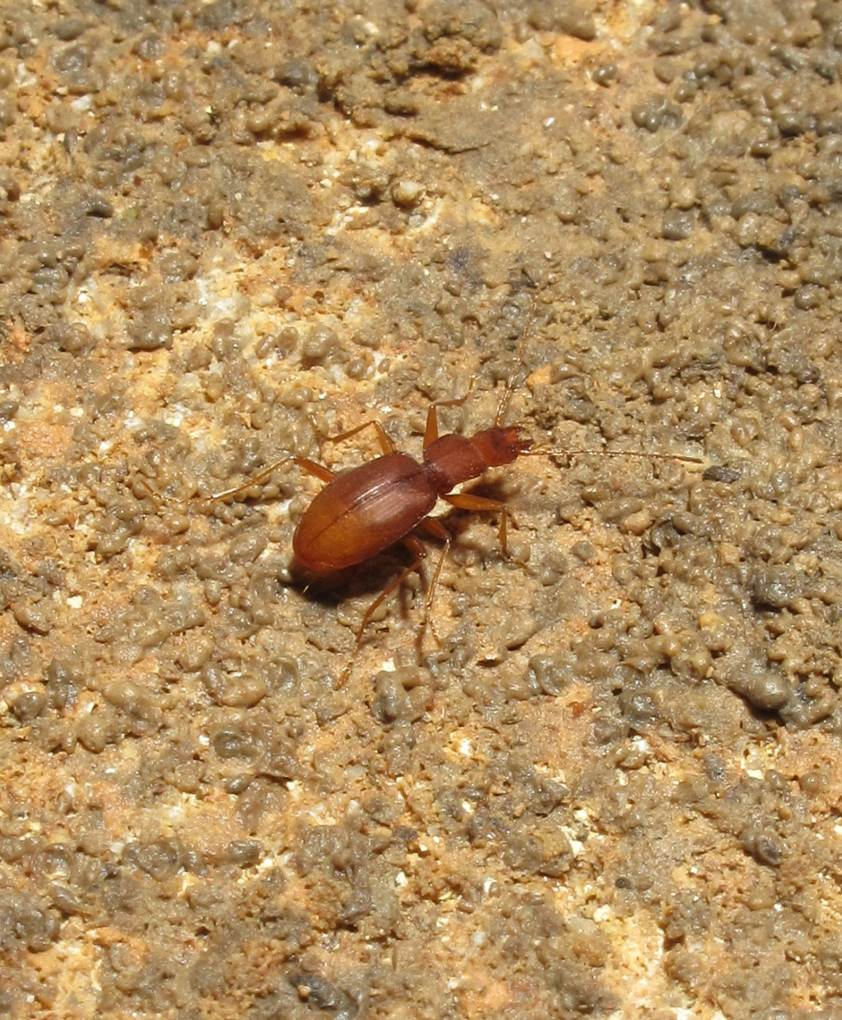
- Pseudanophthalmus colemanensis

Scientific classification
- Domain: Eukaryota
- Kingdom: Animalia
- Phylum: Arthropoda
- Class: Insecta
- Order: Coleoptera
- Suborder: Adephaga
- Family: Carabidae
- Subfamily: Trechinae
- Tribe: Trechini; Bonelli, 1810

Subtribes
- Aepina Fowler, 1887; Perileptina Sloane, 1903; Trechina Bonelli, 1810; Trechodina Jeannel, 1926

Diversity
- at least 270 genera

= Trechini =

Tribe of beetles

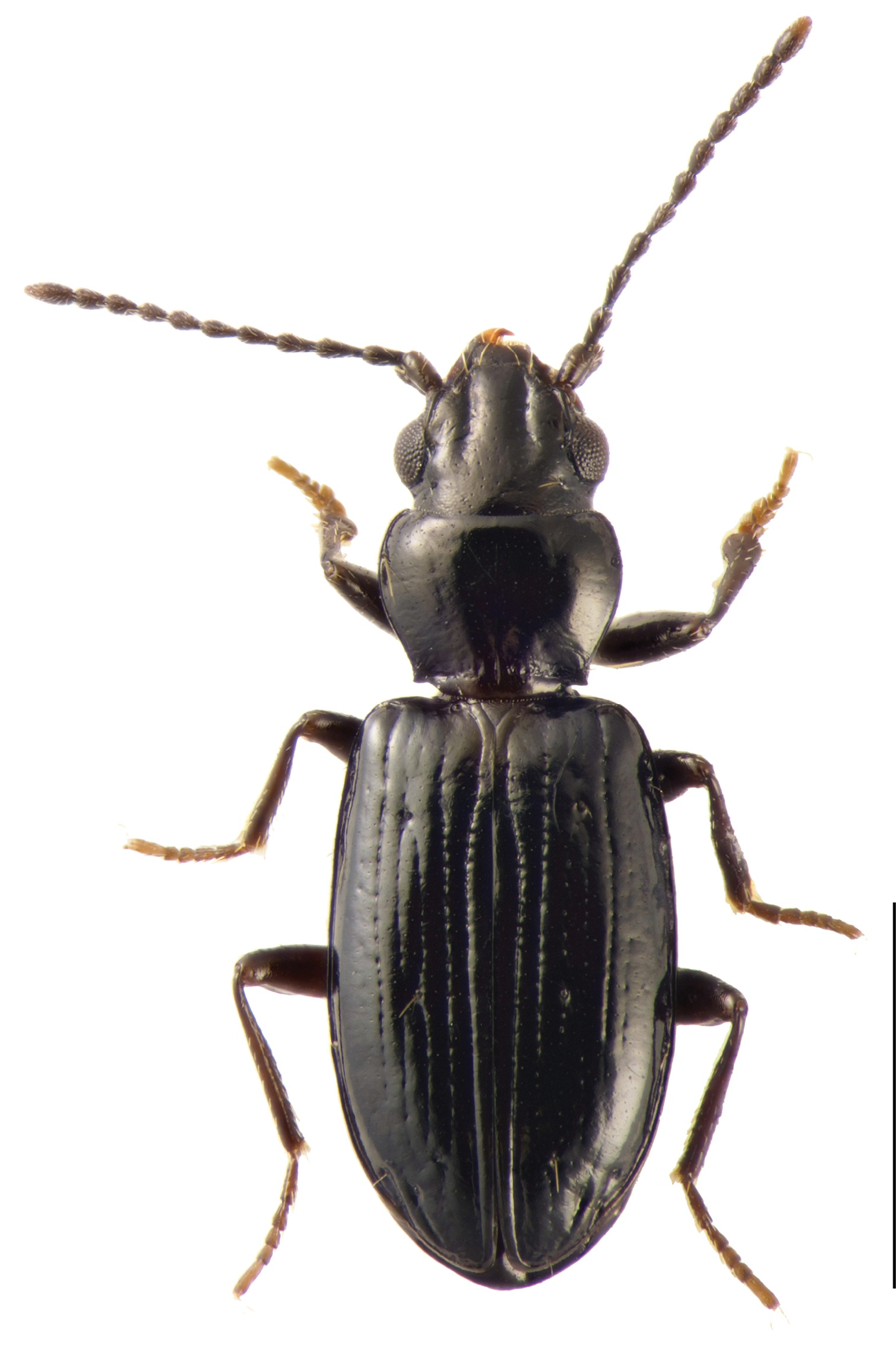
Tasmanitachoides Erwini, Tasmania, Australia

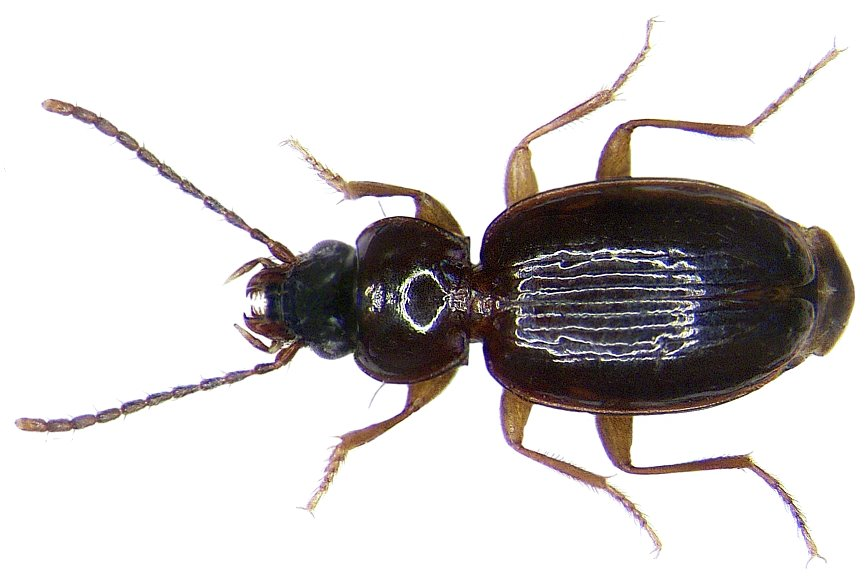
Trechus splendens

Trechini is a large tribe of ground beetles in the family Carabidae. There are more than 270 genera and over 2,400 described species in Trechini, found throughout the world.

The ground beetles of this tribe are small, typically less than 5 mm in length and sometimes 1 mm or less. They occur in a wide variety of habitats on every continent except Antarctica. Though the extinct genus Antarctotrechus indicates that they were formerly present on that continent.

== Genera ==
These genera belong to the tribe Trechini:

Subtribe Aepina Fowler, 1887
Aepopsis Jeannel, 1922
Aepus Leach in Samouelle, 1819
Kenodactylus Broun, 1909
Kiwitrechus Larochelle & Larivière, 2007
Maoritrechus Brookes, 1932
Neanops Britton, 1962
Oarotrechus Townsend, 2010
Temnostega Enderlein, 1905
Thalassobius Solier, 1849
Waiputrechus Townsend, 2010
Subtribe Perileptina Sloane, 1903
Apoplotrechus Alluaud, 1915
Neoblemus Jeannel, 1923
Perileptus Schaum, 1860
Subtribe Trechina Bonelli, 1810
Accoella Ueno, 1990
Acheroniotes Lohaj & Lakota, 2010
Adriaphaenops Noesske, 1928
Aepiblemus Belousov & Kabak, 1993
Agonotrechus Jeannel, 1923
Agostinia Jeannel, 1928
Alanorites Belousov, 1998
Albanotrechus Casale & V.B.Gueorguiev, 1994
Allegrettia Jeannel, 1928
Allotrechiama Ueno, 1970
Ameroduvalius Valentine, 1952
Anchotrechus Jeannel, 1927
Andinorites Mateu & Belles, 1980
Andinotrechus Mateu, 1981
Anillidius Jeannel, 1928
Anophthalmus Sturm, 1844
Aphaenopidius G.Müller, 1913
Aphaenops Bonvouloir, 1862
Aphaenopsis G.Müller, 1913
Apocimmerites Belousov, 1998
Apoduvalius Jeannel, 1953
Aputrechisibus Trezzi, 2007
Arctaphaenops Meixner, 1925
Aspidaphaenops Ueno, 2006
Austrotrechus B.Moore, 1972
Awatrechus Ueno, 1955
Balazucellus Deuve, 2001
Bathytrechus Ueno, 2005
Beronaphaenops B.V.Gueorguiev, 2012
Birmaphaenops Deuve, 2017
Blemus Dejean, 1821
Boldoriella Jeannel, 1928
Boreaphaenops Ueno, 2002
Bothynotrechus B.Moore, 1972
Casaleaphaenops Tian; Huang & Ma, 2021
Cathaiaphaenops Deuve, 1996
Caucasaphaenops Belousov, 1999
Caucasorites Belousov & Zamotajlov, 1997
Chaetoduvalius Jeannel, 1928
Chaetotrechiama Ueno, 1982
Chiapadytes Vigna Taglianti, 1977
Chu Tian & He, 2020
Cimbrodytes Piva, 2021
Cimmerites Jeannel, 1928
Cimmeritodes Deuve, 1996
Ckacus Tian & Huang, 2021
Columbitrechus Mateu, 1982
Coreoblemus Ueno, 1969
Croatotrechus Casale & Jalzic, 1999
Dabatrechus Ueno, 2004
Dactylotrechus Belousov & Kabak, 2003
Daiconotrechus Ueno, 1971
Dalmataphaenops Monguzzi, 1993
Darlingtonea Valentine, 1952
Derossiella Queinnec, 2008
Deuveaphaenops Tian & Huang, 2017
Dianotrechus Tian, 2016
Doderotrechus Vigna Taglianti, 1968
Dongoblemus Deuve & Tian, 2016
Dongodytes Deuve, 1993
Dracotrechus Ueno, 2010
Duvalioblemus Deuve, 1995
Duvaliomimus Jeannel, 1928
Duvaliopsis Jeannel, 1928
Duvalius Delarouzée, 1859
Eocnides Jeannel, 1954
Epaphiopsis Ueno, 1953
Epaphiotrechus Deuve & Kavanaugh, 2016
Epaphius Leach in Samouelle, 1819
Erebotrechus Britton, 1964
Escolatrechus Mateu, 2003
Eutrechopsis B.Moore, 1972
Eutrechus B.Moore, 1972
Geotrechus Jeannel, 1919
Giraffaphaenops Deuve, 2002
Glabroduvalius Vrbica; Curcic; Antic & Curcic, 2013
Goedetrechus B.Moore, 1972
Gotoblemus Ueno, 1970
Graciliblemus Deuve & Tian, 2016
Guatemalatrechus Trezzi, 2003
Guiaphaenops Deuve, 2002
Guizhaphaenops Vigna Taglianti, 1997
Guizhaphaenopsoides Tian; Huang & Li, 2021
Gulaphaenops Ueno, 1987
Himalaphaenops Ueno, 1980
Himalotrechus Belousov; Kabak & J.Schmidt, 2019
Homaloderodes Jeannel, 1962
Huoyanodytes Tian & Huang, 2016
Iberotrechus Jeannel, 1920
Iga Ueno, 1953
Incatrechus Mateu & Belles, 1982
Inotrechus Dolzhanski & Ljovushkin, 1989
Ishidatrechus Ueno, 1956
Ishikawatrechus Habu, 1950
Italaphaenops Ghidini, 1964
Iyotrechus Ueno & Naito, 2009
Jalzicaphaenops Lohaj & Lakota, 2010
Jeannelius Kurnakov, 1959
Jiangxiaphaenops Ueno & Clarke, 2007
Jiulongotrechus Tian; Huang & Wang, 2015
Junaphaenops Ueno, 1997
Junnanotrechus Ueno & Yin, 1993
Kettlotrechus Townsend, 2010
Kosswigia Jeannel, 1947
Kozlovites Jeannel, 1935
Kupetrechus Larochelle & Larivière, 2007
Kurasawatrechus Yoshida & Nomura, 1952
Kusumia Ueno, 1952
Lanxangaphaenops Deuve, 2012
Laoblemus Ueno, 2006
Laosaphaenops Deuve, 2000
Lessinodytes Vigna Taglianti, 1982
Libotrechus Ueno, 1998
Luoxiaotrechus Tian & Yin, 2013
Luyatrechus M.Etonti & Mateu, 2000
Luzonotrechus Ueno, 1979
Mamesdytes Trezzi, 2003
Masuzoa Ueno, 1960
Masuzonoblemus Ueno, 1989
Mayaphaenops Vigna Taglianti, 1977
Meganophthalmus Kurnakov, 1959
Mexaphaenops Bolivar y Pieltain, 1942
Mexitrechus Barr, 1982
Miaotrechus Tian; Chen & Ma, 2020
Microblemus Ueno, 2007
Mimanillus B.Moore, 1972
Mimotrechus B.Moore, 1972
Minimaphaenops Deuve, 2000
Minosaphaenops Queinnec, 2008
Minutotrechus Deuve & Kavanaugh, 2016
Nannotrechus Winkler, 1926
Nanotrechiama Belousov & Kabak, 2018
Neaphaenops Jeannel, 1920
Nelsonites Valentine, 1952
Neotrechus G.Müller, 1913
Nesaeoduvalius Casale & Giachino, 2016
Nesiotrechus Ueno, 1995
Nipponaphaenops Ueno, 1971
Nototrechus B.Moore, 1972
Nunbergites Pawlowski & Stachowiak, 1991
Omalodera Blanchard, 1842
Oodinotrechus Ueno, 1998
Oroblemites Ueno & Pawlowski, 1981
Oroblemus Ueno & Yoshida, 1966
Orotrechus G.Müller, 1913
Oxytrechus Jeannel, 1927
Panaphaenops Tian; Huang & Ma, 2021
Paracimmerites Belousov, 1998
Paraphaenops Jeannel, 1916
Paratrechiotes Ueno, 1995
Paratrechus Jeannel, 1920
Petraphaenops Delic; Kapla & Colla, 2019
Pheggomisetes Knirsch, 1923
Pilosaphaenops Deuve & Tian, 2008
Plesioaphaenops Deuve & Tian, 2011
Pogonoschema Jeannel, 1927
Pontodytes Casale & Giachino, 1989
Porocimmerites Belousov, 1998
Protrechiama Belousov & Kabak, 2003
Pseudanophthalmus Jeannel, 1920
Pseudaphaenops Winkler, 1912
Pseudocnides Jeannel, 1927
Pseudotrechisibus Mateu & Belles, 1982
Puertrechus Belousov & Kabak, 2014
Putzeysius Jeannel, 1962
Qianaphaenops Ueno, 2000
Qianotrechus Ueno, 2000
Queinnectrechus Deuve, 1992
Rakantrechus Ueno, 1951
Ryugadous Habu, 1950
Sardaphaenops Cerruti & Henrot, 1956
Satotrechus Ueno, 2006
Sbordoniella Vigna Taglianti, 1980
Scotoplanetes Absolon, 1913
Scototrechus Britton, 1962
Shenaphaenops Ueno, 1999
Shennongotrechus Ueno, 2004
Shenoblemus Tian & Fang, 2020
Shilinotrechus Ueno, 2003
Shiqianaphaenops Tian, 2016
Shuangheaphaenops Tian, 2017
Shuaphaenops Ueno, 1999
Sichuanotrechus Deuve, 2005
Sidublemus Tian & Yin, 2013
Sinaphaenops Ueno & Wang, 1991
Sinocimmerites Deuve, 2007
Sinotrechiama Ueno, 2000
Sinotroglodytes Deuve, 1996
Sloanella Jeannel, 1927
Speotrechus Jeannel, 1922
Stevensius Jeannel, 1923
Stygiotrechus Ueno, 1958
Subilsia Español, 1967
Sumatrechus Deuve, 2005
Superbotrechus Deuve & Tian, 2009
Suzuka Ueno, 1956
Taiwanotrechus Ueno, 1987
Taniatrechus Belousov & Dolzhanski, 1994
Tasmanorites Jeannel, 1927
Tasmanotrechus B.Moore, 1972
Taurocimmerites Belousov, 1998
Thalassoduvalius Ueno, 1956
Tianeotrechus Tian & Tang, 2016
Tianzhuaphaenops Zhao & Tian, 2016
Tienmutrechus Suenson, 1957
Tonkinaphaenops Deuve, 2013
Toshiaphaenops Ueno, 1999
Trechepaphiama Deuve & Kavanaugh, 2016
Trechepaphiopsis Deuve & Kavanaugh, 2016
Trechiama Jeannel, 1927
Trechiamiotes Deuve, 1998
Trechicomimus Mateu & Nègre, 1972
Trechiella Jeannel, 1927
Trechimorphus Jeannel, 1927
Trechinotus Jeannel, 1962
Trechiotes Jeannel, 1954
Trechisibus Motschulsky, 1862
Trechistus B.Moore, 1972
Trechoblemus Ganglbauer, 1891
Trechus Clairville, 1806
Trichaphaenops Jeannel, 1916
Troglocimmerites Ljovuschkin, 1970
Tropidotrechus Jeannel, 1927
Typhlotrechus G.Müller, 1913
Uenoaphaenops Tian & He, 2020
Uenoites Belousov & Kabak, 2016
Uenotrechus Deuve & Tian, 1999
Ushijimaella Ueno, 1980
Velebitaphaenops Casale & Jalzic, 2012
Velesaphaenops S.Curcic et al., 2018
Vietotrechus Ueno, 1995
Wanhuaphaenops Tian & Wang, 2016
Wanoblemus Tian & Fang, 2016
Wulongoblemus Ueno, 2007
Xenotrechus Barr & Krekeler, 1967
Xiangxius Tian; Huang & Li, 2021
Xuedytes Tian & Huang, 2017
Yalongaphaenops Belousov & Kabak, 2021
Yamautidius Ueno, 1957
Yanzaphaenops Ueno, 2010
Yunotrechus Tian & Huang, 2014
Zhijinaphaenops Ueno & Ran, 2002
Subtribe Trechodina Jeannel, 1926
Amblystogenium Enderlein, 1905
Canarobius Machado, 1987
Cnides Motschulsky, 1862
Cothresia Jeannel, 1964
Cyphotrechodes Jeannel, 1926
Eotrechodes Ueno; Lafer & Sundukov, 1995
Himalotrechodes Ueno, 1981
Iberotrechodes Faille et al., 2021
Pachydesus Motschulsky, 1864
Pachytrechodes Jeannel, 1960
Paratrechodes Jeannel, 1926
Scaurotrechodes Geginat, 2006
Spelaeovulcania Machado, 1987
Sporades Fauvel, 1882
Thalassophilus Wollaston, 1854
Trechobembix Jeannel, 1926
Trechodes Blackburn, 1901
Trechosia Jeannel, 1926
Trechosiella Jeannel, 1960
Not placed in a subtribe
†Antarctotrechus Ashworth & Erwin, 2016
†Trechinites Heer, 1862
†Trechoides Motschulsky, 1856
