= Pogonoschema =

Scientific classification
- Domain: Eukaryota
- Kingdom: Animalia
- Phylum: Arthropoda
- Class: Insecta
- Order: Coleoptera
- Suborder: Adephaga
- Family: Carabidae
- Subfamily: Trechinae
- Tribe: Trechini
- Subtribe: Trechina
- Genus: Pogonoschema; Jeannel, 1927

Genus of beetles

Pogonoschema is a genus in the ground beetle family Carabidae. There are at least four described species in Pogonoschema, found in Australia.

== Species ==
These four species belong to the genus Pogonoschema:

- Pogonoschema pallipes B.Moore, 1972
- Pogonoschema robustius Lorenz, 1998
- Pogonoschema sloanei Jeannel, 1927
- Pogonoschema solidum B.Moore, 1972
