= Queinnectrechus =

Scientific classification
- Domain: Eukaryota
- Kingdom: Animalia
- Phylum: Arthropoda
- Class: Insecta
- Order: Coleoptera
- Suborder: Adephaga
- Family: Carabidae
- Subfamily: Trechinae
- Tribe: Trechini
- Subtribe: Trechina
- Genus: Queinnectrechus; Deuve, 1992

Subgenera
- Gaoligongtrechus Deuve & Kavanaugh, 2016; Queinnectrechus Deuve, 1992

Genus of beetles

Queinnectrechus is a genus in the beetle family Carabidae. There are about 17 described species in Queinnectrechus, found in China.

== Species ==
These 17 species belong to the genus Queinnectrechus:

- Queinnectrechus angusticollis Belousov & Kabak, 2003
- Queinnectrechus balli Deuve & Kavanaugh, 2016
- Queinnectrechus brevis Belousov & Kabak, 2003
- Queinnectrechus excentricus Deuve, 1992
- Queinnectrechus fabbrii Casale & Magrini, 2009
- Queinnectrechus glacialis Ueno, 1998
- Queinnectrechus globipennis Ueno, 1998
- Queinnectrechus gongshanicus Deuve & Liang, 2016
- Queinnectrechus griswoldi Deuve & Kavanaugh, 2016
- Queinnectrechus guttula Belousov & Kabak, 2003
- Queinnectrechus humeralis Belousov & Kabak, 2003
- Queinnectrechus incisus Belousov & Kabak, 2003
- Queinnectrechus janatai Belousov & Kabak, 2003
- Queinnectrechus micrangulus Belousov & Kabak, 2003
- Queinnectrechus miroslavi Belousov & Kabak, 2003
- Queinnectrechus smetanai Ueno, 1995
- Queinnectrechus zheduoshanus Ueno, 1998
