= Trechisibus =

Scientific classification
- Kingdom: Animalia
- Phylum: Arthropoda
- Class: Insecta
- Order: Coleoptera
- Suborder: Adephaga
- Family: Carabidae
- Subfamily: Trechinae
- Tribe: Trechini
- Subtribe: Trechina
- Genus: Trechisibus; Motschulsky, 1862

Subgenera
- Ecuadoritrechus Deuve, 2002; Nothotrechisibus Ueno, 1971; Trechisibiellus Jeannel, 1962; Trechisibiodes Ueno, 1972; Trechisibiontes M.Etonti & Mateu, 1992; Trechisibiorites Jeannel, 1962; Trechisibitus Bonniard de Saludo, 1970; Trechisibus Motschulsky, 1862

Genus of beetles

Trechisibus is a genus of in the beetle family Carabidae. There are more than 150 described species in Trechisibus.

== Species ==
These 154 species belong to the genus Trechisibus:

- Trechisibus acutangulus Mateu & Belles, 1981 (Peru)
- Trechisibus aguirrei Deuve & Moret, 2017 (Ecuador)
- Trechisibus albertaecaroli Deuve, 2006 (Bolivia)
- Trechisibus alexius Bonniard de Saludo, 1970 (Chile)
- Trechisibus alticola Mateu, 1979 (Peru)
- Trechisibus amesi M.Etonti & Mateu, 1992 (Peru)
- Trechisibus amplipennis M.Etonti & Mateu, 1996 (Peru)
- Trechisibus antarcticus (Dejean, 1831) (Chile, Argentina, Falkland Islands, and South Georgia)
- Trechisibus apukhapiensis Ruiz-Tapiador & Delgado, 2016 (Peru)
- Trechisibus arduus Mateu, 1979 (Peru)
- Trechisibus aricensis Jeannel, 1958 (Chile)
- Trechisibus atratus Jeannel, 1962 (Chile)
- Trechisibus axillaris (Putzeys, 1870) (Chile)
- Trechisibus aymara Trezzi, 2005 (Bolivia)
- Trechisibus ayrtoni Guzzetti, 2012 (Bolivia)
- Trechisibus backstromi Andrewes, 1931 (Chile)
- Trechisibus barragani Deuve & Moret, 2017 (Ecuador)
- Trechisibus bellesi M.Etonti & Mateu, 2002 (Peru)
- Trechisibus bohorquezae M.Etonti & Mateu, 1992 (Peru)
- Trechisibus bolivarianus Trezzi, 2011 (Bolivia)
- Trechisibus bordoni Mateu, 1978 (Peru)
- Trechisibus brachyderus Jeannel, 1962 (Chile)
- Trechisibus bravoi Delgado & Ruiz-Tapiador, 2020 (Peru)
- Trechisibus brevicornis Ueno, 1976 (Peru)
- Trechisibus bruchi Jeannel, 1937 (Argentina)
- Trechisibus brundini Ueno, 1974 (Chile)
- Trechisibus budae Trezzi & Guzzetti, 2020 (Bolivia)
- Trechisibus calathiformis Deuve, 2002 (Ecuador)
- Trechisibus callanganus Jeannel, 1937 (Peru)
- Trechisibus cekalovici Jeannel, 1961 (Chile)
- Trechisibus chacasinus Allegro; Giachino & Sciaky, 2008
- Trechisibus chaudoiri Jeannel, 1954 (Peru)
- Trechisibus chloroticus (Putzeys, 1870) (Chile)
- Trechisibus chucurensis Trezzi, 2007 (Peru)
- Trechisibus cochabambaensis Trezzi, 2021 (Bolivia)
- Trechisibus coiffaiti Bonniard de Saludo, 1970 (Chile)
- Trechisibus collaris Jeannel, 1961 (Chile)
- Trechisibus complanatus Jeannel, 1962 (Chile)
- Trechisibus convexiusculus Jeannel, 1962 (Peru)
- Trechisibus crassipes Ueno, 1972 (Peru)
- Trechisibus cristinensis Jeannel, 1962 (Argentina)
- Trechisibus curtii Allegro & Giachino, 2016 (Peru)
- Trechisibus cuzcoensis M.Etonti & Mateu, 1996 (Peru)
- Trechisibus cyclopterus (Putzeys, 1870) (Chile)
- Trechisibus daccordii Allegro; Giachino & Sciaky, 2008 (Chile)
- Trechisibus darwini Jeannel, 1927 (Argentina)
- Trechisibus decensii Allegro; Giachino & Sciaky, 2008 (Peru)
- Trechisibus delestali Delgado & Ruiz-Tapiador, 2016 (Peru)
- Trechisibus depressior Deuve, 2002 (Ecuador)
- Trechisibus depressus (Germain, 1855) (Chile)
- Trechisibus dimaioi Casale, 1978 (Bolivia)
- Trechisibus dispar Jeannel, 1937 (Peru)
- Trechisibus ebeninus Jeannel, 1962 (Chile)
- Trechisibus eleonorae Allegro; Giachino & Sciaky, 2008
- Trechisibus elisae Delgado & Ruiz-Tapiador, 2020 (Peru)
- Trechisibus emiliae Deuve & Moret, 2017 (Ecuador)
- Trechisibus falklandicus Schweiger, 1959 (Falkland Islands)
- Trechisibus femoralis (Germain, 1855) (Chile)
- Trechisibus ferrugineus (Brullé, 1842) (Bolivia)
- Trechisibus forsteri (Schweiger, 1958) (Bolivia)
- Trechisibus franzi Mateu & Nègre, 1972 (Peru)
- Trechisibus geae M.Etonti & Mateu, 1998 (Argentina)
- Trechisibus germaini Jeannel, 1962 (Chile)
- Trechisibus gigas Trezzi, 2007 (Peru)
- Trechisibus gonzalesi M.Etonti & Mateu, 1992 (Peru)
- Trechisibus guzzettii Trezzi, 2011 (Bolivia)
- Trechisibus homaloderoides Ueno, 1976 (Peru)
- Trechisibus hornensis (Fairmaire, 1885) (Chile and Argentina)
- Trechisibus huascarani Allegro & Giachino, 2016 (Peru)
- Trechisibus huemul Trezzi, 2021 (Argentina)
- Trechisibus illiampu Trezzi, 2021 (Bolivia)
- Trechisibus inca Mateu, 1979 (Peru)
- Trechisibus incertus M.Etonti & Mateu, 1996 (Peru)
- Trechisibus infuscatus Mateu, 1978 (Peru)
- Trechisibus jasinskii Deuve, 2001 (Ecuador)
- Trechisibus jeanneli Bonniard de Saludo, 1970 (Chile)
- Trechisibus jorgeluisi Delgado & Ruiz-Tapiador, 2020 (Peru)
- Trechisibus kamergei Jeannel, 1962 (Chile)
- Trechisibus kuscheli Jeannel, 1954 (Chile)
- Trechisibus lacunensis Mateu, 1978 (Peru)
- Trechisibus laevissimus (Putzeys, 1870) (Chile and Peru)
- Trechisibus lamasi M.Etonti & Mateu, 1992 (Peru)
- Trechisibus laresensis M.Etonti & Mateu, 1996 (Peru)
- Trechisibus latellai Mateu & M.Etonti, 2006 (Peru)
- Trechisibus leechi Ueno, 1972 (Peru)
- Trechisibus lemairei Allegro & Giachino, 2016 (Peru)
- Trechisibus liberatrix Mateu, 1979 (Peru)
- Trechisibus loeffleri Jeannel, 1958 (Peru)
- Trechisibus lojaensis Deuve, 2002 (Ecuador)
- Trechisibus longicornis Mateu & Nègre, 1972 (Chile)
- Trechisibus lurdus M.Etonti & Mateu, 1999
- Trechisibus macrocephalus Jeannel, 1930 (Bolivia)
- Trechisibus magellanus Jeannel, 1961 (Chile)
- Trechisibus martinezi Mateu, 1978 (Peru)
- Trechisibus maucauensis Mateu & M.Etonti, 2002 (Peru)
- Trechisibus michelbacheri Ueno, 1972 (Peru)
- Trechisibus minutus M.Etonti & Mateu, 1996 (Peru)
- Trechisibus missionis Allegro; Giachino & Sciaky, 2008
- Trechisibus monrosi Mateu & Nègre, 1972 (Argentina)
- Trechisibus moreti Deuve, 2002 (Ecuador)
- Trechisibus nahuelanus Mateu & Nègre, 1972 (Chile)
- Trechisibus nevadoi Roig-Juñent & Sallanave, 2005
- Trechisibus nicki Schweiger, 1959 (Peru)
- Trechisibus nigripennis (Solier, 1849) (Chile and Argentina)
- Trechisibus nitidus (Germain, 1855) (Chile)
- Trechisibus obesus Jeannel, 1954 (Peru)
- Trechisibus obtusiusculus Jeannel, 1962 (Chile)
- Trechisibus olympicus Allegro; Giachino & Sciaky, 2008
- Trechisibus oreobates Jeannel, 1962 (Chile)
- Trechisibus orophilus Mateu & M.Etonti, 2002 (Peru)
- Trechisibus ovalipennis Jeannel, 1962 (Chile)
- Trechisibus ovalis Jeannel, 1958 (Peru)
- Trechisibus pascoensis Mateu, 1978 (Peru)
- Trechisibus patarcochae Allegro; Giachino & Sciaky, 2008
- Trechisibus peruvianus Jeannel, 1927 (Peru)
- Trechisibus pierrei Mateu, 1979 (Peru)
- Trechisibus pubescens Deuve & Moret, 2017 (Ecuador)
- Trechisibus punaensis M.Etonti & Mateu, 2000 (Peru)
- Trechisibus punctiventris (Germain, 1855) (Chile)
- Trechisibus pygmaeus Jeannel, 1930 (Bolivia)
- Trechisibus quierocochensis Mateu, 1978 (Peru)
- Trechisibus quietus M.Etonti & Mateu, 2000 (Peru)
- Trechisibus rarianus M.Etonti & Mateu, 1996 (Peru)
- Trechisibus rectangulus Jeannel, 1962 (Chile)
- Trechisibus recuayi Allegro & Giachino, 2016 (Peru)
- Trechisibus rossi Ueno, 1972 (Peru)
- Trechisibus saizi Bonniard de Saludo, 1970 (Chile)
- Trechisibus schmidti Ueno, 1971 (Peru)
- Trechisibus setulosus Mateu & Nègre, 1972 (Chile)
- Trechisibus silviae Delgado & Ruiz-Tapiador, 2020 (Peru)
- Trechisibus sinuatus Jeannel, 1962 (Chile)
- Trechisibus spelaeus Mateu & Belles, 1981 (Peru)
- Trechisibus straneoi Bonniard de Saludo, 1970 (Chile)
- Trechisibus stricticollis Jeannel, 1962 (Chile)
- Trechisibus subglobosus Mateu & Belles, 1981 (Peru)
- Trechisibus tapiai Deuve, 2002
- Trechisibus tenuitarsis Mateu, 1979 (Peru)
- Trechisibus theresiae M.Etonti & Mateu, 1996 (Peru)
- Trechisibus ticliensis Trezzi, 2007 (Peru)
- Trechisibus topali Mateu & Nègre, 1972 (Chile and Argentina)
- Trechisibus tripunctatus Jeannel, 1958 (Peru)
- Trechisibus trisetosus Jeannel, 1958 (Peru)
- Trechisibus tucumanus Jeannel, 1962 (Argentina)
- Trechisibus tunarii Trezzi, 2015 (Bolivia)
- Trechisibus tupackatarianus Trezzi & Guzzetti, 2015 (Bolivia)
- Trechisibus ukupachensis Trezzi, 2007 (Peru)
- Trechisibus valenciai M.Etonti & Mateu, 1992 (Peru)
- Trechisibus variicornis (Putzeys, 1870) (Bolivia)
- Trechisibus veneroi M.Etonti & Mateu, 1992 (Peru)
- Trechisibus ventricosus Jeannel, 1958 (Peru)
- Trechisibus vivesi Mateu, 2000 (Peru)
- Trechisibus wachucochae Allegro; Giachino & Sciaky, 2008
- Trechisibus wardi M.Etonti, 2003 (Bolivia)
- Trechisibus yanamensis Allegro; Giachino & Sciaky, 2008
