= Lessinodytes =

Scientific classification
- Domain: Eukaryota
- Kingdom: Animalia
- Phylum: Arthropoda
- Class: Insecta
- Order: Coleoptera
- Suborder: Adephaga
- Family: Carabidae
- Subfamily: Trechinae
- Tribe: Trechini
- Subtribe: Trechina
- Genus: Lessinodytes; Vigna Taglianti, 1982

Genus of beetles

Lessinodytes is a genus in the ground beetle family Carabidae. There are at least three described species in Lessinodytes, found in Italy.

== Species ==
These three species belong to the genus Lessinodytes:

- Lessinodytes caoduroi Vigna Taglianti, 1982
- Lessinodytes glacialis Vigna Taglianti & Sciaky, 1988
- Lessinodytes pivai Vigna Taglianti & Sciaky, 1988
