= Paratrechus =

Scientific classification
- Domain: Eukaryota
- Kingdom: Animalia
- Phylum: Arthropoda
- Class: Insecta
- Order: Coleoptera
- Suborder: Adephaga
- Family: Carabidae
- Subfamily: Trechinae
- Tribe: Trechini
- Subtribe: Trechina
- Genus: Paratrechus; Jeannel, 1920

Genus of beetles

Paratrechus is a genus in the beetle family Carabidae. There are more than 50 described species in Paratrechus, found in Mexico, and Central and South America.

== Species ==
These 57 species belong to the genus Paratrechus:

- Paratrechus alaoensis Mateu, 1999 (Ecuador)
- Paratrechus alexandri Trezzi, 1995 (Costa Rica)
- Paratrechus altitudinis Mateu, 1974 (Mexico)
- Paratrechus austrinus Moret, 2005
- Paratrechus balli Barr, 1982 (Mexico)
- Paratrechus barri Mateu, 1999 (Ecuador)
- Paratrechus batesi Mateu, 1974 (Mexico)
- Paratrechus beltrani Mateu, 1974 (Mexico)
- Paratrechus bifoveatus (Jeannel, 1920)
- Paratrechus bolivari Mateu, 1974 (Mexico)
- Paratrechus boussingaulti Mateu & Moret, 2001 (Ecuador)
- Paratrechus campbelli Mateu, 1999 (Guatemala)
- Paratrechus cataractae Barr, 1982 (Mexico)
- Paratrechus chiriquensis Barr, 1982 (Panama)
- Paratrechus clermonti Jeannel, 1928 (Brazil)
- Paratrechus collanensis Mateu, 1999 (Ecuador)
- Paratrechus contrarius Barr, 1982 (Mexico)
- Paratrechus costaricensis Mateu, 1974 (Costa Rica)
- Paratrechus cubillini Mateu & Moret, 2001 (Ecuador)
- Paratrechus erwini Barr, 1982 (Mexico)
- Paratrechus franiai Barr, 1982 (Guatemala)
- Paratrechus gouleti Mateu, 1999 (Costa Rica)
- Paratrechus grandiceps Ueno, 1968 (Ecuador)
- Paratrechus gressitti Ueno, 1968 (Ecuador)
- Paratrechus halffteri Mateu, 1974 (Costa Rica)
- Paratrechus hoegei (Jeannel, 1920)
- Paratrechus hypogeus Deuve & Moret, 2017 (Ecuador)
- Paratrechus incertus Mateu, 1999 (Colombia)
- Paratrechus isabelae Trezzi, 2018 (Colombia)
- Paratrechus jeanneli Barr, 1982 (Mexico)
- Paratrechus laevigatus Jeannel, 1928
- Paratrechus laticeps Barr, 1982 (Mexico)
- Paratrechus maddisoni Deuve & Moret, 2017 (Ecuador)
- Paratrechus mandurensis Mateu, 1999 (Ecuador)
- Paratrechus matilei Mateu & Moret, 2001 (Ecuador)
- Paratrechus mexicanus (Putzeys, 1870)
- Paratrechus moreti Mateu, 1999 (Ecuador)
- Paratrechus nemoralis Mateu & Moret, 2001 (Ecuador)
- Paratrechus nigrilacus Mateu & Moret, 2001 (Ecuador)
- Paratrechus oaxaquensis Barr, 1982 (Mexico)
- Paratrechus obrieni Mateu, 1981 (Costa Rica)
- Paratrechus osorioi Bolivar y Pieltain, 1943 (Mexico)
- Paratrechus pallescens (Bolivar y Pieltain, 1967) (Mexico)
- Paratrechus panamensis Mateu, 1999 (Panama)
- Paratrechus pecki Barr, 1982 (Costa Rica)
- Paratrechus propior Barr, 1982 (Mexico)
- Paratrechus putzeysi Barr, 1982 (Mexico)
- Paratrechus reddelli Barr, 1982 (Mexico)
- Paratrechus reyesi Mateu, 1974 (Costa Rica)
- Paratrechus subparallelus Mateu, 1999 (Ecuador)
- Paratrechus sylvarum Mateu, 1974 (Mexico)
- Paratrechus sylvaticus (Bolivar y Pieltain, 1941) (Mexico)
- Paratrechus tacana Barr, 1982 (Mexico)
- Paratrechus totontepec Barr, 1982 (Mexico)
- Paratrechus unisetosus Mateu, 1999 (Ecuador)
- Paratrechus versutus Mateu, 1999 (Ecuador)
- Paratrechus vulcanus Mateu, 1999 (Ecuador)
