= Pachytrechodes =

Scientific classification
- Domain: Eukaryota
- Kingdom: Animalia
- Phylum: Arthropoda
- Class: Insecta
- Order: Coleoptera
- Suborder: Adephaga
- Family: Carabidae
- Subfamily: Trechinae
- Tribe: Trechini
- Subtribe: Trechodina
- Genus: Pachytrechodes; Jeannel, 1960

Genus of beetles

Pachytrechodes is a genus in the ground beetle family Carabidae. There are at least four described species in Pachytrechodes, found in Tanzania.

== Species ==
These four species belong to the genus Pachytrechodes:

- Pachytrechodes basilewskyi Jeannel, 1960
- Pachytrechodes brevis Belousov & Nyundo, 2013
- Pachytrechodes leleupi Ueno, 1987
- Pachytrechodes uncinatus Ueno, 1987
