= Pseudotrechisibus =

Scientific classification
- Kingdom: Animalia
- Phylum: Arthropoda
- Class: Insecta
- Order: Coleoptera
- Suborder: Adephaga
- Family: Carabidae
- Tribe: Trechini
- Subtribe: Trechina
- Genus: Pseudotrechisibus; Mateu & Belles, 1982
- Species: P. sphaericus

Binomial name
- Pseudotrechisibus sphaericus Mateu & Belles, 1982

Genus of beetles

Pseudotrechisibus is a genus in the ground beetle family Carabidae. This genus has a single species, Pseudotrechisibus sphaericus. It is found in Peru.

The genus was described in 1982 by the entomologists José Mateu and Xavier Bellés. It belongs to the tribe Trechini, a group of ground beetles widely distributed in South America.
