= Chaetoduvalius =

Scientific classification
- Kingdom: Animalia
- Phylum: Arthropoda
- Class: Insecta
- Order: Coleoptera
- Suborder: Adephaga
- Family: Carabidae
- Tribe: Trechini
- Subtribe: Trechina
- Genus: Chaetoduvalius; Jeannel, 1928
- Species: C. saetosus

Binomial name
- Chaetoduvalius saetosus (Knirsch, 1913)

Genus of beetles

Chaetoduvalius is a genus in the ground beetle family Carabidae. This genus has a single species, Chaetoduvalius saetosus. It is found in Romania.
