= Duvalioblemus =

Scientific classification
- Domain: Eukaryota
- Kingdom: Animalia
- Phylum: Arthropoda
- Class: Insecta
- Order: Coleoptera
- Suborder: Adephaga
- Family: Carabidae
- Subfamily: Trechinae
- Tribe: Trechini
- Subtribe: Trechina
- Genus: Duvalioblemus; Deuve, 1995

Subgenera
- Duvalioblemus Deuve, 1995; Shublemus Deuve; He & Tian, 2020; Yunnanoblemus Deuve, 2014

Genus of beetles

Duvalioblemus is a genus in the beetle family Carabidae. There are at least three described species in Duvalioblemus, found in China.

== Species ==
These three species belong to the genus Duvalioblemus:

- Duvalioblemus faillei Deuve, 2014
- Duvalioblemus liyuani Deuve; He & Tian, 2020
- Duvalioblemus sichuanicus Deuve, 1995
