= Spelaeovulcania =

Scientific classification
- Domain: Eukaryota
- Kingdom: Animalia
- Phylum: Arthropoda
- Class: Insecta
- Order: Coleoptera
- Suborder: Adephaga
- Family: Carabidae
- Tribe: Trechini
- Subtribe: Trechodina
- Genus: Spelaeovulcania; Machado, 1987
- Species: S. canariensis

Binomial name
- Spelaeovulcania canariensis Machado, 1987

Genus of beetles

Spelaeovulcania is a genus in the ground beetle family Carabidae. This genus has a single species, Spelaeovulcania canariensis. It is found in the Canary Islands.
