= Minosaphaenops =

Scientific classification
- Domain: Eukaryota
- Kingdom: Animalia
- Phylum: Arthropoda
- Class: Insecta
- Order: Coleoptera
- Suborder: Adephaga
- Family: Carabidae
- Subfamily: Trechinae
- Tribe: Trechini
- Subtribe: Trechina
- Genus: Minosaphaenops; Queinnec, 2008

Genus of beetles

Minosaphaenops is a genus in the ground beetle family Carabidae. There are at least two described species in Minosaphaenops.

== Species ==
These two species belong to the genus Minosaphaenops:

- Minosaphaenops croaticus Lohaj & Jalzic, 2009 (Croatia)
- Minosaphaenops ollivieri Queinnec, 2008 ((former) Yugoslavia, Montenegro)
