= Sloanella =

Scientific classification
- Domain: Eukaryota
- Kingdom: Animalia
- Phylum: Arthropoda
- Class: Insecta
- Order: Coleoptera
- Suborder: Adephaga
- Family: Carabidae
- Subfamily: Trechinae
- Tribe: Trechini
- Subtribe: Trechina
- Genus: Sloanella; Jeannel, 1927

Genus of beetles

Sloanella is a genus in the beetle family Carabidae. There are about five described species in Sloanella, found in Australia.

== Species ==
These five species belong to the genus Sloanella:

- Sloanella gordoni Eberhard & Giachino, 2011
- Sloanella obscura B.Moore, 1983
- Sloanella pallida B.Moore, 1972
- Sloanella simsoni (Blackburn, 1894)
- Sloanella suavis B.Moore, 1972
