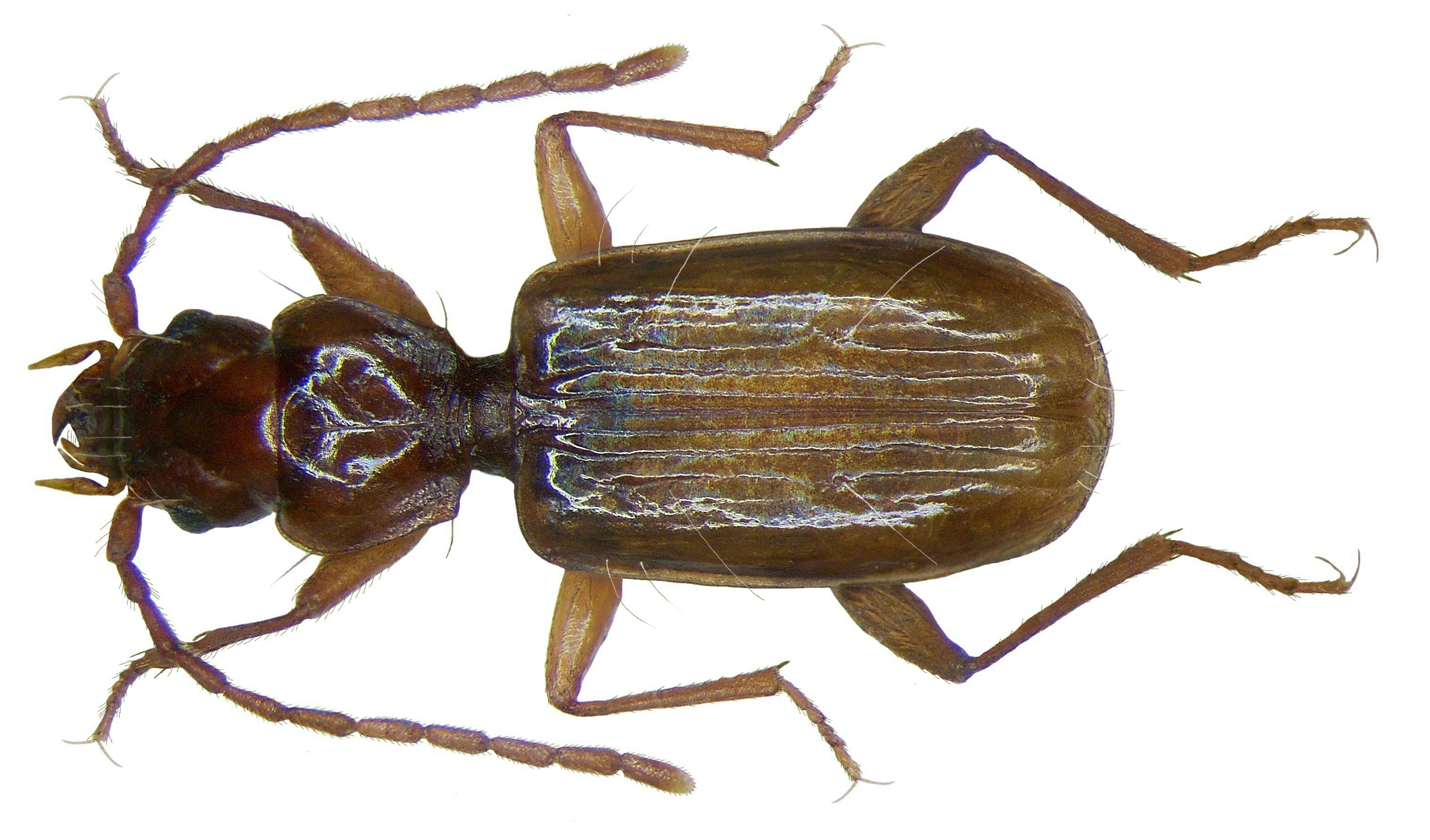
- Thalassophilus longicornis

Scientific classification
- Domain: Eukaryota
- Kingdom: Animalia
- Phylum: Arthropoda
- Class: Insecta
- Order: Coleoptera
- Suborder: Adephaga
- Family: Carabidae
- Subfamily: Trechinae
- Tribe: Trechini
- Subtribe: Trechodina
- Genus: Thalassophilus; Wollaston, 1854

= Thalassophilus =

Genus of beetles

Thalassophilus is a genus of beetles in the family Carabidae.

== Species ==
These seven species belong to the genus Thalassophilus:

- Thalassophilus azoricus Oromi & Borges, 1991 (Ground beetle) (the Azores)
- Thalassophilus breuili Jeannel, 1926 (Spain)
- Thalassophilus caecus Jeannel, 1938 (Madeira)
- Thalassophilus longicornis (Sturm, 1825) (Europe, western Asia)
- Thalassophilus pieperi Erber, 1990 (Madeira)
- Thalassophilus subterraneus Machado, 1989 (the Canary Islands)
- Thalassophilus whitei Wollaston, 1854 (Madeira and the Canary Islands)
