= Eutrechus =

Scientific classification
- Domain: Eukaryota
- Kingdom: Animalia
- Phylum: Arthropoda
- Class: Insecta
- Order: Coleoptera
- Suborder: Adephaga
- Family: Carabidae
- Subfamily: Trechinae
- Tribe: Trechini
- Subtribe: Trechina
- Genus: Eutrechus; B.Moore, 1972

Genus of beetles

Eutrechus is a genus in the ground beetle family Carabidae. There are at least four described species in Eutrechus, found in Australia.

== Species ==
These four species belong to the genus Eutrechus:

- Eutrechus barringtonensis B.Moore, 1972
- Eutrechus coxi (Sloane, 1911)
- Eutrechus gippslandicus (Sloane, 1923)
- Eutrechus otwayensis (B.Moore, 1960)
