= Geotrechus =

Scientific classification
- Domain: Eukaryota
- Kingdom: Animalia
- Phylum: Arthropoda
- Class: Insecta
- Order: Coleoptera
- Suborder: Adephaga
- Family: Carabidae
- Subfamily: Trechinae
- Tribe: Trechini
- Subtribe: Trechina
- Genus: Geotrechus; Jeannel, 1919

Genus of beetles

Geotrechus is a genus in the beetle family Carabidae. There are more than 20 described species in Geotrechus, found in Europe.

== Species ==
These 28 species belong to the genus Geotrechus:

- Geotrechus aldensis Jeannel, 1955 (France)
- Geotrechus andreae Jeannel, 1920 (France)
- Geotrechus boumortensis Faille; Bourdeau; Bellés & Fresneda, 2015 (Spain)
- Geotrechus delioti Faille; Bourdeau; Bellés & Fresneda, 2015 (Spain)
- Geotrechus dequaei Dupré, 1988 (Spain)
- Geotrechus discontignyi (Fairmaire, 1867) (France)
- Geotrechus dumonti Español, 1977 (Spain)
- Geotrechus gallicus (Delarouzée, 1857) (France)
- Geotrechus holcartensis Genest, 1977 (France)
- Geotrechus incantatus Faille; Bourdeau; Bellés & Fresneda, 2015 (Spain)
- Geotrechus jeanneli A.Gaudin, 1938 (France)
- Geotrechus orcinus (Linder, 1859) (France)
- Geotrechus orpheus (Dieck, 1869) (France)
- Geotrechus palei Fourès, 1962 (France)
- Geotrechus picanyoli Español & Escola, 1983 (Spain)
- Geotrechus puigmalensis Lagar Mascaro, 1981 (Spain)
- Geotrechus sarpedon Faille; Fresneda & Bourdeau, 2013 (France)
- Geotrechus saulcyi (Argod-Vallon, 1913) (France)
- Geotrechus seijasi Español, 1969 (Spain)
- Geotrechus serrulatus Jeannel, 1946 (France)
- Geotrechus soussieuxi Perreau & Queinnec, 1987 (France)
- Geotrechus sulcatus Coiffait, 1959 (France)
- Geotrechus trophonius (Abeille de Perrin, 1872) (France)
- Geotrechus ubachi Español, 1965 (Spain)
- Geotrechus vandeli Coiffait, 1959 (France)
- Geotrechus vanderberghi Perreau & Queinnec, 1987 (France)
- Geotrechus victoriai Faille; Bourdeau; Bellés & Fresneda, 2015 (Spain)
- Geotrechus vulcanus (Abeille de Perrin, 1904) (France)
