= Nipponaphaenops =

Scientific classification
- Domain: Eukaryota
- Kingdom: Animalia
- Phylum: Arthropoda
- Class: Insecta
- Order: Coleoptera
- Suborder: Adephaga
- Family: Carabidae
- Tribe: Trechini
- Subtribe: Trechina
- Genus: Nipponaphaenops; Ueno, 1971
- Species: N. erraticus

Binomial name
- Nipponaphaenops erraticus Ueno, 1971

Genus of beetles

Nipponaphaenops is a genus in the ground beetle family Carabidae. This genus has a single species, Nipponaphaenops erraticus. It is found in Japan.
