= Paratrechiotes =

Scientific classification
- Domain: Eukaryota
- Kingdom: Animalia
- Phylum: Arthropoda
- Class: Insecta
- Order: Coleoptera
- Suborder: Adephaga
- Family: Carabidae
- Tribe: Trechini
- Subtribe: Trechina
- Genus: Paratrechiotes; Ueno, 1995
- Species: P. ocydromoides

Binomial name
- Paratrechiotes ocydromoides Ueno, 1995

Genus of beetles

Paratrechiotes is a genus in the ground beetle family Carabidae. This genus has a single species, Paratrechiotes ocydromoides. It is found in Vietnam.
