= Chiapadytes =

Scientific classification
- Domain: Eukaryota
- Kingdom: Animalia
- Phylum: Arthropoda
- Class: Insecta
- Order: Coleoptera
- Suborder: Adephaga
- Family: Carabidae
- Subfamily: Trechinae
- Tribe: Trechini
- Subtribe: Trechina
- Genus: Chiapadytes; Vigna Taglianti, 1977

Genus of beetles

Chiapadytes is a genus in the ground beetle family Carabidae. There are at least two described species in Chiapadytes.

== Species ==
These two species belong to the genus Chiapadytes:

- Chiapadytes bolivari Vigna Taglianti, 1977
- Chiapadytes pitteti Casale & Magrini, 2021
