= Croatotrechus =

Scientific classification
- Kingdom: Animalia
- Phylum: Arthropoda
- Class: Insecta
- Order: Coleoptera
- Suborder: Adephaga
- Family: Carabidae
- Subfamily: Trechinae
- Tribe: Trechini
- Subtribe: Trechina
- Genus: Croatotrechus; Casale & Jalzic, 1999
- Species: C. tvrtkovici

Binomial name
- Croatotrechus tvrtkovici Casale & Jalzic, 1999

Genus of beetles

Croatotrechus is a genus in the ground beetle family Carabidae. This genus has a single species, Croatotrechus tvrtkovici. It is found in Croatia.
