= Mayaphaenops =

Scientific classification
- Domain: Eukaryota
- Kingdom: Animalia
- Phylum: Arthropoda
- Class: Insecta
- Order: Coleoptera
- Suborder: Adephaga
- Family: Carabidae
- Tribe: Trechini
- Subtribe: Trechina
- Genus: Mayaphaenops; Vigna Taglianti, 1977
- Species: M. sbordonii

Binomial name
- Mayaphaenops sbordonii Vigna Taglianti, 1977

Genus of beetles

Mayaphaenops is a genus in the ground beetle family Carabidae. This genus has a single species, Mayaphaenops sbordonii.
