= Nesiotrechus =

Scientific classification
- Domain: Eukaryota
- Kingdom: Animalia
- Phylum: Arthropoda
- Class: Insecta
- Order: Coleoptera
- Suborder: Adephaga
- Family: Carabidae
- Subfamily: Trechinae
- Tribe: Trechini
- Subtribe: Trechina
- Genus: Nesiotrechus; Ueno, 1995

Subgenera
- Hubeitrechus Deuve, 2005; Nesiotrechus Ueno, 1995

Synonyms
- Hubeitrechus Deuve, 2005; Lamprotrechus Ueno, 1975

Genus of beetles

Nesiotrechus is a genus in the ground beetle family Carabidae. There are at least two described species in Nesiotrechus.

== Species ==
These two species belong to the genus Nesiotrechus:

- Nesiotrechus convexiusculus (Ueno, 1975) (Japan)
- Nesiotrechus dahongensis Deuve, 2005 (China)
