= Shilinotrechus =

Scientific classification
- Domain: Eukaryota
- Kingdom: Animalia
- Phylum: Arthropoda
- Class: Insecta
- Order: Coleoptera
- Suborder: Adephaga
- Family: Carabidae
- Subfamily: Trechinae
- Tribe: Trechini
- Subtribe: Trechina
- Genus: Shilinotrechus; Ueno, 2003

Genus of beetles

Shilinotrechus is a genus in the beetle family Carabidae. There are at least three described species in Shilinotrechus, found in China.

== Species ==
These three species belong to the genus Shilinotrechus:

- Shilinotrechus anthonyi Huang; Tian & Faille, 2020
- Shilinotrechus fusiformis Ueno, 2003
- Shilinotrechus intricatus Huang & Tian, 2015
