= Yamautidius =

Scientific classification
- Kingdom: Animalia
- Phylum: Arthropoda
- Class: Insecta
- Order: Coleoptera
- Suborder: Adephaga
- Family: Carabidae
- Subfamily: Trechinae
- Tribe: Trechini
- Subtribe: Trechina
- Genus: Yamautidius; Ueno, 1957

Subgenera
- Miyamaidius Ueno, 1978; Yamautidius Ueno, 1957

Genus of beetles

Yamautidius is a genus of beetles in the family Carabidae, found in Japan. The following species belong to Yamautidius:

- Yamautidius aenigmaticus Ueno, 1978
- Yamautidius anaulax Ueno, 1978
- Yamautidius basisquamatus Ueno, 1982
- Yamautidius compositus Ueno, 1982
- Yamautidius croson Ueno & Naito, 2006
- Yamautidius debilis Ueno, 1982
- Yamautidius dilaticollis Ueno, 1982
- Yamautidius edentatus Ueno, 1982
- Yamautidius emarginatus Ueno, 1982
- Yamautidius eos Ueno, 1982
- Yamautidius fissuralis Ueno, 1990
- Yamautidius flabellatus Ueno, 1982
- Yamautidius hirakei Ueno, 1982
- Yamautidius ishikawaorum Ueno, 1982
- Yamautidius latipennis Ueno, 1960
- Yamautidius mohrii Ueno, 1982
- Yamautidius pubicollis Ueno, 1957
- Yamautidius rarissimus Ueno, 1982
- Yamautidius ryosukei Ueno, 1960
- Yamautidius securiger Ueno, 1982
- Yamautidius spinulosus Ueno, 1982
- Yamautidius squamosus Ueno, 1982
- Yamautidius sucmo Ueno & Naito, 2006
- Yamautidius tetsuoi Ueno, 1982
- Yamautidius uozumii Ueno, 1982
- Yamautidius yamauchii Ueno, 1982
