= Oxytrechus =

Scientific classification
- Domain: Eukaryota
- Kingdom: Animalia
- Phylum: Arthropoda
- Class: Insecta
- Order: Coleoptera
- Suborder: Adephaga
- Family: Carabidae
- Subfamily: Trechinae
- Tribe: Trechini
- Subtribe: Trechina
- Genus: Oxytrechus; Jeannel, 1927

Genus of beetles

Oxytrechus is a genus in the beetle family Carabidae. There are more than 30 described species in Oxytrechus, found in South America.

== Species ==
These 38 species belong to the genus Oxytrechus:

- Oxytrechus alexei Delgado & Ruiz-Tapiador, 2019 (Peru)
- Oxytrechus andersoni Giachino & Allegro, 2021 (Ecuador)
- Oxytrechus arechavaletae (Putzeys, 1870) (Uruguay)
- Oxytrechus atahualpai Giachino & Allegro, 2021 (Ecuador)
- Oxytrechus balli Allegro; Giachino & Sciaky, 2008 (Ecuador)
- Oxytrechus bavierai Giachino & Allegro, 2021 (Ecuador)
- Oxytrechus belloi Giachino; Allegro & Baviera, 2014 (Ecuador)
- Oxytrechus bousqueti Mateu, 1991 (Colombia)
- Oxytrechus campbelli Mateu, 1991 (Colombia)
- Oxytrechus caucaensis Mateu, 1991 (Colombia)
- Oxytrechus cayambeensis Quéinnec & Ollivier (Ecuador)
- Oxytrechus chioriae Quéinnec & Ollivier (Ecuador)
- Oxytrechus convexus Mateu, 1991 (Ecuador)
- Oxytrechus cyathiderus Jeannel, 1954 (Peru)
- Oxytrechus equatorianus Mateu, 1988 (Ecuador)
- Oxytrechus fasciger (Putzeys, 1870) (Chile)
- Oxytrechus fikaceki Giachino & Moret, 2021 (Ecuador)
- Oxytrechus floresanus Giachino & Allegro, 2021 (Colombia)
- Oxytrechus gitzeni M.Etonti, 2002 (Peru)
- Oxytrechus globosus Mateu, 1991 (Ecuador)
- Oxytrechus guaguanus Mateu, 1991 (Ecuador)
- Oxytrechus jeanneli Mateu, 1991 (Colombia)
- Oxytrechus juani Delgado & Ruiz-Tapiador, 2019 (Peru)
- Oxytrechus llanganatisianus Mateu, 1988 (Ecuador)
- Oxytrechus mateui Allegro; Giachino & Sciaky, 2008
- Oxytrechus moreti Mateu, 1988 (Ecuador)
- Oxytrechus norae Mateu, 1982 (Colombia)
- Oxytrechus onorei Allegro; Giachino & Sciaky, 2008 (Ecuador)
- Oxytrechus osellai Giachino; Allegro & Baviera, 2014 (Ecuador)
- Oxytrechus paredesi M.Etonti & Mateu, 1992 (Peru)
- Oxytrechus pierremoreti Allegro; Giachino & Sciaky, 2008 (Ecuador)
- Oxytrechus reventadori Moret, 2005
- Oxytrechus ruizianus Giachino & Allegro, 2021 (Colombia)
- Oxytrechus sciakyi Giachino & Allegro, 2021 (Ecuador)
- Oxytrechus silvianus Mateu, 1991 (Colombia)
- Oxytrechus solitarius Mateu, 1991 (Colombia)
- Oxytrechus vulcanus Mateu, 1988 (Ecuador)
- Oxytrechus zoiai Casale & Sciaky, 1986 (Ecuador)
