= Alanorites =

Scientific classification
- Kingdom: Animalia
- Phylum: Arthropoda
- Clade: Pancrustacea
- Class: Insecta
- Order: Coleoptera
- Suborder: Adephaga
- Family: Carabidae
- Subfamily: Trechinae
- Tribe: Trechini
- Subtribe: Trechina
- Genus: Alanorites; Belousov, 1998

Genus of beetles

Alanorites is a genus in the beetle family Carabidae. There are at least four described species in Alanorites, found in Russia.

== Species ==
These four species belong to the genus Alanorites:

- Alanorites enigmaticus Belousov, 1998
- Alanorites labensis Belousov, 1998
- Alanorites sulcatus Belousov, 1998
- Alanorites teberdensis Belousov, 1998
