= Doderotrechus =

Scientific classification
- Domain: Eukaryota
- Kingdom: Animalia
- Phylum: Arthropoda
- Class: Insecta
- Order: Coleoptera
- Suborder: Adephaga
- Family: Carabidae
- Subfamily: Trechinae
- Tribe: Trechini
- Subtribe: Trechina
- Genus: Doderotrechus; Vigna Taglianti, 1968

Genus of beetles

Doderotrechus is a genus in the beetle family Carabidae. There are at least three described species in Doderotrechus, found in Italy.

== Species ==
These three species belong to the genus Doderotrechus:

- Doderotrechus casalei Vigna Taglianti, 1969
- Doderotrechus crissolensis (Dodero, 1924)
- Doderotrechus ghilianii (Fairmaire, 1859)
