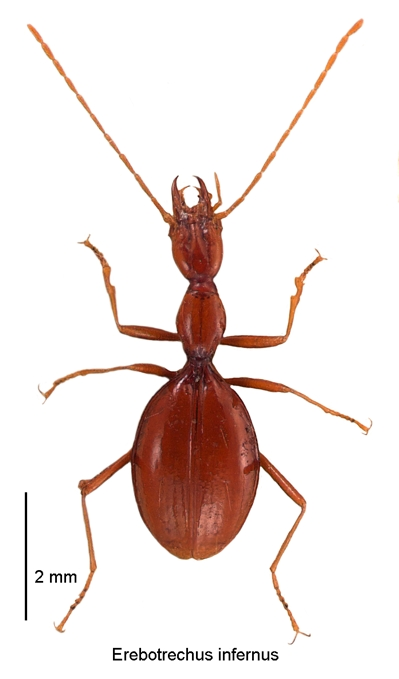
- Erebotrechus infernus

Scientific classification
- Domain: Eukaryota
- Kingdom: Animalia
- Phylum: Arthropoda
- Class: Insecta
- Order: Coleoptera
- Suborder: Adephaga
- Family: Carabidae
- Subfamily: Trechinae
- Tribe: Trechini
- Subtribe: Trechina
- Genus: Erebotrechus; Britton, 1964
- Species: E. infernus

Binomial name
- Erebotrechus infernus Britton, 1964

= Erebotrechus =

Genus of beetles

Erebotrechus is a genus in the ground beetle family Carabidae. This genus has a single species, Erebotrechus infernus, found in New Zealand.
