= Dalmataphaenops =

Scientific classification
- Domain: Eukaryota
- Kingdom: Animalia
- Phylum: Arthropoda
- Class: Insecta
- Order: Coleoptera
- Suborder: Adephaga
- Family: Carabidae
- Subfamily: Trechinae
- Tribe: Trechini
- Subtribe: Trechina
- Genus: Dalmataphaenops; Monguzzi, 1993
- Species: D. chiarae

Binomial name
- Dalmataphaenops chiarae Monguzzi, 1993

Synonyms
- Biokovoaphaenopsis Jalzic, 1993

Genus of beetles

Dalmataphaenops is a genus in the ground beetle family Carabidae. This genus has a single species, Dalmataphaenops chiarae. It is found in Croatia.
