= Pachydesus =

Scientific classification
- Kingdom: Animalia
- Phylum: Arthropoda
- Class: Insecta
- Order: Coleoptera
- Suborder: Adephaga
- Family: Carabidae
- Subfamily: Trechinae
- Tribe: Trechini
- Subtribe: Trechodina
- Genus: Pachydesus; Motschulsky, 1864

Genus of beetles

Pachydesus is a genus in the beetle family Carabidae. There are more than 30 described species in Pachydesus.

== Species ==
These 39 species belong to the genus Pachydesus:

- Pachydesus aethiopicus Basilewsky, 1974 (Ethiopia)
- Pachydesus alluaudi (Jeannel, 1913) (Democratic Republic of the Congo and Uganda)
- Pachydesus altipeta (Jeannel, 1935) (Kenya)
- Pachydesus anosyanus Basilewsky, 1981 (Madagascar)
- Pachydesus bohemani (Jeannel, 1926) (South Africa)
- Pachydesus brincki (Basilewsky, 1958) (South Africa)
- Pachydesus bucculentus (Alluaud, 1933) (Democratic Republic of the Congo)
- Pachydesus bulirschi Geginat, 2009 (South Africa)
- Pachydesus burgeoni (Alluaud, 1933) (Democratic Republic of the Congo and Uganda)
- Pachydesus caffer (Jeannel, 1964) (South Africa)
- Pachydesus celisi (Jeannel, 1955) (Democratic Republic of the Congo)
- Pachydesus chappuisi (Jeannel, 1935) (Kenya)
- Pachydesus cuccodoroi Deuve, 2005
- Pachydesus descarpentriesi Basilewsky, 1972 (Madagascar)
- Pachydesus edwardsi (Jeannel, 1940) (Uganda)
- Pachydesus ernei Deuve, 2005
- Pachydesus fletcheri (Jeannel, 1959) (Uganda)
- Pachydesus geginati Deuve, 2005
- Pachydesus gravis (Péringuey, 1898) (South Africa)
- Pachydesus holmi Deuve, 2005
- Pachydesus kenyensis (Jeannel, 1913) (Kenya)
- Pachydesus kilimanus (Jeannel, 1913) (Tanzania)
- Pachydesus kinangopinus (Jeannel, 1935) (Kenya)
- Pachydesus kochi (Straneo, 1960) (Madagascar)
- Pachydesus leleupi (Jeannel, 1960) (Tanzania)
- Pachydesus longulus (Jeannel, 1964) (South Africa)
- Pachydesus marojejyanus Basilewsky, 1981 (Madagascar)
- Pachydesus ovalipennis (Jeannel, 1964) (South Africa)
- Pachydesus parilis (Péringuey, 1908) (South Africa)
- Pachydesus parvicollis (Jeannel, 1964) (South Africa)
- Pachydesus pauliani (Jeannel, 1950) (Madagascar)
- Pachydesus rafaelae Geginat, 2009 (South Africa)
- Pachydesus raffrayi (Jeannel, 1930) (South Africa)
- Pachydesus robustus (Alluaud, 1933) (Democratic Republic of the Congo)
- Pachydesus rotundatus (Jeannel, 1959) (Democratic Republic of the Congo and Uganda)
- Pachydesus rufipes (Boheman, 1848) (Kenya, Tanzania, Zimbabwe, Botswana, Namibia, and South Africa)
- Pachydesus ruwenzoricus (Alluaud, 1933) (Democratic Republic of the Congo and Uganda)
- Pachydesus scitulus (Péringuey, 1896) (South Africa)
- Pachydesus unisetosus (Jeannel, 1935) (Kenya)
