= Giraffaphaenops =

Scientific classification
- Domain: Eukaryota
- Kingdom: Animalia
- Phylum: Arthropoda
- Class: Insecta
- Order: Coleoptera
- Suborder: Adephaga
- Family: Carabidae
- Subfamily: Trechinae
- Tribe: Trechini
- Subtribe: Trechina
- Genus: Giraffaphaenops; Deuve, 2002

Genus of beetles

Giraffaphaenops is a genus in the beetle family Carabidae. There are at least three described species in Giraffaphaenops, all found in China.

== Species ==
These three species belong to the genus Giraffaphaenops:

- Giraffaphaenops brevicephalus Ma; Huang & Tian, 2020
- Giraffaphaenops clarkei Deuve, 2002
- Giraffaphaenops yangi Tian & Luo, 2015
