= Tasmanotrechus =

Scientific classification
- Domain: Eukaryota
- Kingdom: Animalia
- Phylum: Arthropoda
- Class: Insecta
- Order: Coleoptera
- Suborder: Adephaga
- Family: Carabidae
- Subfamily: Trechinae
- Tribe: Trechini
- Subtribe: Trechina
- Genus: Tasmanotrechus; B.Moore, 1972

Genus of beetles

Tasmanotrechus is a genus of beetles in the family Carabidae, containing the following species:

- Tasmanotrechus alticola - Eberhard & Giachino, 2011
- Tasmanotrechus cockerilli - Moore, 1972
- Tasmanotrechus compactus - Moore, 1983
- Tasmanotrechus concolor - Moore, 1972
- Tasmanotrechus elongatus - Moore, 1994
- Tasmanotrechus gordoni - Eberhard & Giachino, 2011
- Tasmanotrechus leai - (Sloane, 1920)
- Tasmanotrechus montisfieldi - Eberhard & Giachino, 2011
- Tasmanotrechus moorei - Eberhard & Giachino, 2011
- Tasmanotrechus osbornianus - Eberhard & Giachino, 2011
- Tasmanotrechus rolani - Eberhard & Giachino, 2011
