= Mimanillus =

Scientific classification
- Domain: Eukaryota
- Kingdom: Animalia
- Phylum: Arthropoda
- Class: Insecta
- Order: Coleoptera
- Suborder: Adephaga
- Family: Carabidae
- Tribe: Trechini
- Subtribe: Trechina
- Genus: Mimanillus; B.Moore, 1972
- Species: M. gracilis

Binomial name
- Mimanillus gracilis B.Moore, 1972

Genus of beetles

Mimanillus is a genus in the ground beetle family Carabidae. This genus has a single species, Mimanillus gracilis. It is found in Australia.
