= Speotrechus =

Scientific classification
- Domain: Eukaryota
- Kingdom: Animalia
- Phylum: Arthropoda
- Class: Insecta
- Order: Coleoptera
- Suborder: Adephaga
- Family: Carabidae
- Tribe: Trechini
- Subtribe: Trechina
- Genus: Speotrechus; Jeannel, 1922
- Species: S. mayeti

Binomial name
- Speotrechus mayeti (Abeille de Perrin, 1875)

Synonyms
- Anophthalmus Peyerimhoff, 1909

Genus of beetles

Speotrechus is a genus in the ground beetle family Carabidae. This genus has a single species, Speotrechus mayeti. It is found in France.
