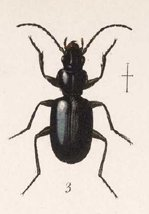
- Mexitrechus coarctatus

Scientific classification
- Domain: Eukaryota
- Kingdom: Animalia
- Phylum: Arthropoda
- Class: Insecta
- Order: Coleoptera
- Suborder: Adephaga
- Family: Carabidae
- Subfamily: Trechinae
- Tribe: Trechini
- Subtribe: Trechina
- Genus: Mexitrechus; Barr, 1982

Synonyms
- Mexitrechus Mateu, 1977

= Mexitrechus =

Genus of beetles

Mexitrechus is a genus in the ground beetle family Carabidae. There are about six described species in Mexitrechus, found in Mexico.

== Species ==
These six species belong to the genus Mexitrechus:

- Mexitrechus coarctatus (Bates, 1882)
- Mexitrechus michoacanus (Bolivar y Pieltain, 1941)
- Mexitrechus mogotensis Barr, 1982
- Mexitrechus occidentalis (Mateu, 1974)
- Mexitrechus quirogai (Bolivar y Pieltain, 1943)
- Mexitrechus tepoztlanensis (Bolivar y Pieltain, 1941)
