= Duvaliopsis =

Scientific classification
- Domain: Eukaryota
- Kingdom: Animalia
- Phylum: Arthropoda
- Class: Insecta
- Order: Coleoptera
- Suborder: Adephaga
- Family: Carabidae
- Subfamily: Trechinae
- Tribe: Trechini
- Subtribe: Trechina
- Genus: Duvaliopsis; Jeannel, 1928

Genus of beetles

Duvaliopsis is a genus in the ground beetle family Carabidae. There are about seven described species in Duvaliopsis, found in Europe.

== Species ==
These seven species belong to the genus Duvaliopsis:

- Duvaliopsis bielzi (Seidlitz, 1867) (Romania)
- Duvaliopsis calimanensis (Knirsch, 1924) (Romania)
- Duvaliopsis leonhardi Maran, 1939
- Duvaliopsis meliki (Csiki, 1912) (Romania)
- Duvaliopsis pilosella (L. Miller, 1868) (Czech Republic, Slovakia, Poland, Ukraine)
- Duvaliopsis rybinskii (Knirsch, 1924) (Ukraine)
- Duvaliopsis transsylvanica (Csiki, 1902) (Romania)
