= Ishidatrechus =

Scientific classification
- Domain: Eukaryota
- Kingdom: Animalia
- Phylum: Arthropoda
- Class: Insecta
- Order: Coleoptera
- Suborder: Adephaga
- Family: Carabidae
- Subfamily: Trechinae
- Tribe: Trechini
- Subtribe: Trechina
- Genus: Ishidatrechus; Ueno, 1956

Genus of beetles

Ishidatrechus is a genus in the ground beetle family Carabidae. There are at least two described species in Ishidatrechus.

== Species ==
These two species belong to the genus Ishidatrechus:

- Ishidatrechus jianensis Li & Chen, 1990 (China)
- Ishidatrechus nitidus Ueno, 1956 (Japan)
