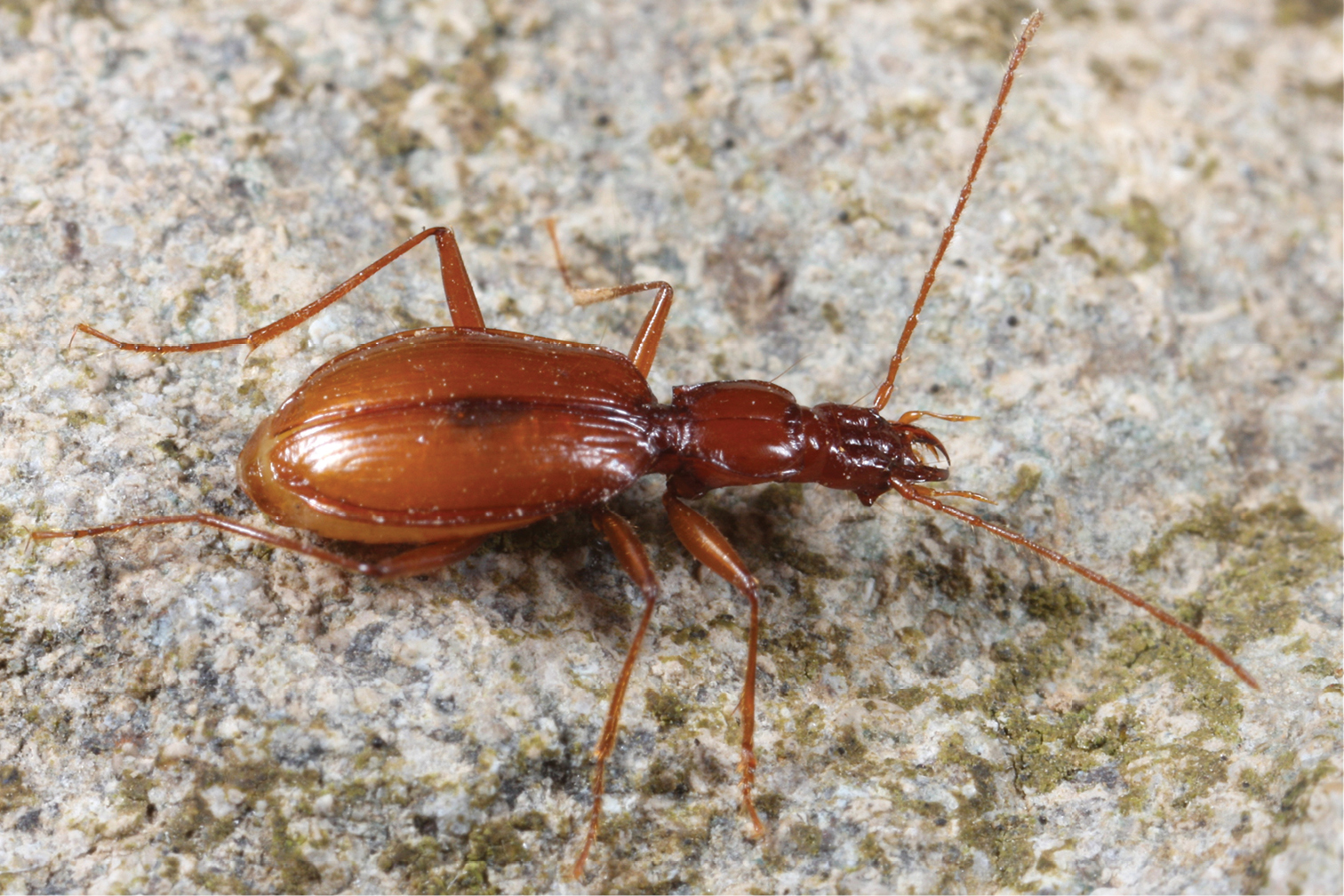

Scientific classification
- Domain: Eukaryota
- Kingdom: Animalia
- Phylum: Arthropoda
- Class: Insecta
- Order: Coleoptera
- Suborder: Adephaga
- Family: Carabidae
- Subfamily: Trechinae
- Tribe: Trechini
- Subtribe: Trechina
- Genus: Darlingtonea; Valentine, 1952
- Species: D. kentuckensis

Binomial name
- Darlingtonea kentuckensis Valentine, 1952

= Darlingtonea =

Genus of beetles

Darlingtonea is a genus in the ground beetle family Carabidae. This genus has a single species, Darlingtonea kentuckensis. It is found in the United States.
