= Oroblemus =

Scientific classification
- Domain: Eukaryota
- Kingdom: Animalia
- Phylum: Arthropoda
- Class: Insecta
- Order: Coleoptera
- Suborder: Adephaga
- Family: Carabidae
- Subfamily: Trechinae
- Tribe: Trechini
- Subtribe: Trechina
- Genus: Oroblemus; Ueno & Yoshida, 1966

Genus of beetles

Oroblemus is a genus in the ground beetle family Carabidae. There are about seven described species in Oroblemus, found in Japan.

== Species ==
These seven species belong to the genus Oroblemus:

- Oroblemus caecus Ueno & Yoshida, 1966
- Oroblemus dilaticollis Ueno, 1983
- Oroblemus katorum Ueno, 1983
- Oroblemus parvicollis Ueno, 1987
- Oroblemus sparsepilifer Ueno, 1975
- Oroblemus subsulcipes Ueno, 1983
- Oroblemus yamauchii Ueno, 1993
