= Cothresia =

Scientific classification
- Domain: Eukaryota
- Kingdom: Animalia
- Phylum: Arthropoda
- Class: Insecta
- Order: Coleoptera
- Suborder: Adephaga
- Family: Carabidae
- Subfamily: Trechinae
- Tribe: Trechini
- Subtribe: Trechodina
- Genus: Cothresia; Jeannel, 1964

Genus of beetles

Cothresia is a genus in the beetle family Carabidae. There are at least four described species in Cothresia, found in South Africa.

== Species ==
These four species belong to the genus Cothresia:

- Cothresia curta Jeannel, 1964
- Cothresia hogsbackiensis Geginat, 2008
- Cothresia megacephala Geginat, 2008
- Cothresia tabulae (Péringuey, 1898)
