= Laosaphaenops =

Scientific classification
- Domain: Eukaryota
- Kingdom: Animalia
- Phylum: Arthropoda
- Class: Insecta
- Order: Coleoptera
- Suborder: Adephaga
- Family: Carabidae
- Tribe: Trechini
- Subtribe: Trechina
- Genus: Laosaphaenops; Deuve, 2000
- Species: L. deharvengi

Binomial name
- Laosaphaenops deharvengi Deuve, 2000

Genus of beetles

Laosaphaenops is a genus in the ground beetle family Carabidae. This genus has a single species, Laosaphaenops deharvengi. It is found in Laos.
