= Jeannelius =

Scientific classification
- Kingdom: Animalia
- Phylum: Arthropoda
- Class: Insecta
- Order: Coleoptera
- Suborder: Adephaga
- Family: Carabidae
- Subfamily: Trechinae
- Tribe: Trechini
- Subtribe: Trechina
- Genus: Jeannelius; Kurnakov, 1959

Genus of beetles

Jeannelius is a genus in the ground beetle family Carabidae. There are at least four described species in Jeannelius.

== Species ==
These four species belong to the genus Jeannelius:

- Jeannelius birsteini Ljovuschkin, 1963 (Russia)
- Jeannelius gloriosus Ljovuschkin, 1965 (Republic of Georgia)
- Jeannelius magnificus Kurnakov, 1959 (Georgia)
- Jeannelius zhicharevi (Lutshnik, 1915) (Russia)
