= Junaphaenops =

Scientific classification
- Domain: Eukaryota
- Kingdom: Animalia
- Phylum: Arthropoda
- Class: Insecta
- Order: Coleoptera
- Suborder: Adephaga
- Family: Carabidae
- Tribe: Trechini
- Subtribe: Trechina
- Genus: Junaphaenops; Ueno, 1997
- Species: J. tumidipennis

Binomial name
- Junaphaenops tumidipennis Ueno, 1997

Genus of beetles

Junaphaenops is a genus in the ground beetle family Carabidae. This genus has a single species, Junaphaenops tumidipennis. It is found in China.
