= Tasmanorites =

Scientific classification
- Domain: Eukaryota
- Kingdom: Animalia
- Phylum: Arthropoda
- Class: Insecta
- Order: Coleoptera
- Suborder: Adephaga
- Family: Carabidae
- Subfamily: Trechinae
- Tribe: Trechini
- Subtribe: Trechina
- Genus: Tasmanorites; Jeannel, 1927

Genus of beetles

Tasmanorites is a genus of beetles in the family Carabidae, containing the following species:

- Tasmanorites aberrans Moore, 1972
- Tasmanorites austrinus (Sloane, 1920)
- Tasmanorites beatricis Eberhard & Giachino, 2011
- Tasmanorites blackburni (Sloane, 1920)
- Tasmanorites brevinotatus (Sloane, 1920)
- Tasmanorites cordicollis Moore, 1972
- Tasmanorites daccordii Eberhard & Giachino, 2011
- Tasmanorites elegans Moore, 1972
- Tasmanorites flavipes (Lea, 1910)
- Tasmanorites glaebarum Moore, 1972
- Tasmanorites grossus Moore, 1972
- Tasmanorites intermedius Moore, 1972
- Tasmanorites laticollis Moore, 1983
- Tasmanorites longinotatus (Sloane, 1920)
- Tasmanorites lynceorum Eberhard & Giachino, 2011
- Tasmanorites madidus Moore, 1972
- Tasmanorites magnus Moore, 1972
- Tasmanorites microphthalmus Eberhard & Giachino, 2011
- Tasmanorites nitens (Putzeys, 1874)
- Tasmanorites perkini Donabauer, 2001
- Tasmanorites pullus Moore, 1972
- Tasmanorites riparius Moore, 1972
- Tasmanorites tasmaniae (Blackburn, 1901)
