= Shenaphaenops =

Scientific classification
- Domain: Eukaryota
- Kingdom: Animalia
- Phylum: Arthropoda
- Class: Insecta
- Order: Coleoptera
- Suborder: Adephaga
- Family: Carabidae
- Tribe: Trechini
- Subtribe: Trechina
- Genus: Shenaphaenops; Ueno, 1999
- Species: S. humeralis

Binomial name
- Shenaphaenops humeralis Ueno, 1999

Genus of beetles

Shenaphaenops is a genus in the beetle family Carabidae. This genus has a single species, Shenaphaenops humeralis. It is found in China.
