= Qianaphaenops =

Scientific classification
- Domain: Eukaryota
- Kingdom: Animalia
- Phylum: Arthropoda
- Class: Insecta
- Order: Coleoptera
- Suborder: Adephaga
- Family: Carabidae
- Subfamily: Trechinae
- Tribe: Trechini
- Subtribe: Trechina
- Genus: Qianaphaenops; Ueno, 2000

Subgenera
- Qianaphaenops Ueno, 2000; Qiandongaphaenops Tian; Huang & Wang, 2015; Sangwangius Tian & Chen, 2019; Tiankengius Tian; Hung & Wang, 2018

Genus of beetles

Qianaphaenops is a genus in the beetle family Carabidae. There are about eight described species in Qianaphaenops, found in China.

== Species ==
These eight species belong to the genus Qianaphaenops:

- Qianaphaenops emersoni Tian & Clarke, 2012
- Qianaphaenops longicornis Ueno, 2000
- Qianaphaenops pilosus Ueno, 2000
- Qianaphaenops rotundicollis Ueno, 2000
- Qianaphaenops rowselli Tian & Chen, 2019
- Qianaphaenops tenuis Ueno, 2000
- Qianaphaenops variabilis Tian; Huang & Wang, 2015
- Qianaphaenops xigouicus Tian; Hung & Wang, 2018
