= Eocnides =

Scientific classification
- Domain: Eukaryota
- Kingdom: Animalia
- Phylum: Arthropoda
- Class: Insecta
- Order: Coleoptera
- Suborder: Adephaga
- Family: Carabidae
- Subfamily: Trechinae
- Tribe: Trechini
- Subtribe: Trechina
- Genus: Eocnides; Jeannel, 1954

Genus of beetles

Eocnides is a genus in the beetle family Carabidae. There are at least two described species in Eocnides.

== Species ==
These two species belong to the genus Eocnides:

- Eocnides assamensis Jeannel, 1954 (India)
- Eocnides fragilis Ueno, 1989 (China)
