= Andinotrechus =

Scientific classification
- Kingdom: Animalia
- Phylum: Arthropoda
- Class: Insecta
- Order: Coleoptera
- Suborder: Adephaga
- Family: Carabidae
- Tribe: Trechini
- Subtribe: Trechina
- Genus: Andinotrechus; Mateu, 1981
- Species: A. naranjoi

Binomial name
- Andinotrechus naranjoi Mateu, 1981

Genus of beetles

Andinotrechus is a genus of ground beetles in the family Carabidae. This genus has a single species, Andinotrechus naranjoi, found in Venezuela.
