= Subilsia =

Scientific classification
- Domain: Eukaryota
- Kingdom: Animalia
- Phylum: Arthropoda
- Class: Insecta
- Order: Coleoptera
- Suborder: Adephaga
- Family: Carabidae
- Tribe: Trechini
- Subtribe: Trechina
- Genus: Subilsia; Español, 1967
- Species: S. senenti

Binomial name
- Subilsia senenti Español, 1967

Genus of beetles

Subilsia is a genus in the ground beetle family Carabidae. This genus has a single species, Subilsia senenti. It is found in Morocco.
