= Pontodytes =

Scientific classification
- Domain: Eukaryota
- Kingdom: Animalia
- Phylum: Arthropoda
- Class: Insecta
- Order: Coleoptera
- Suborder: Adephaga
- Family: Carabidae
- Tribe: Trechini
- Subtribe: Trechina
- Genus: Pontodytes; Casale & Giachino, 1989
- Species: P. cavazzutii

Binomial name
- Pontodytes cavazzutii Casale & Giachino, 1989

Genus of beetles

Pontodytes is a genus in the ground beetle family Carabidae. This genus has a single species, Pontodytes cavazzutii. It is found in Turkey.
