= Qianotrechus =

Scientific classification
- Domain: Eukaryota
- Kingdom: Animalia
- Phylum: Arthropoda
- Class: Insecta
- Order: Coleoptera
- Suborder: Adephaga
- Family: Carabidae
- Subfamily: Trechinae
- Tribe: Trechini
- Subtribe: Trechina
- Genus: Qianotrechus; Ueno, 2000

Subgenera
- Jinfotrechus Deuve, 2014; Qianotrechus Ueno, 2000

Synonyms
- Jinfotrechus Deuve, 2014

Genus of beetles

Qianotrechus is a genus in the ground beetle family Carabidae. There are about five described species in Qianotrechus, found in China.

== Species ==
These five species belong to the genus Qianotrechus:

- Qianotrechus congcongae Tian, Huang, Jia & Zhao, 2021
- Qianotrechus grebennikovi Deuve, 2014
- Qianotrechus laevis Ueno, 2000
- Qianotrechus magnicollis Ueno, 2000
- Qianotrechus tenuicollis Ueno, 2000
