= Masuzonoblemus =

Scientific classification
- Domain: Eukaryota
- Kingdom: Animalia
- Phylum: Arthropoda
- Class: Insecta
- Order: Coleoptera
- Suborder: Adephaga
- Family: Carabidae
- Subfamily: Trechinae
- Tribe: Trechini
- Subtribe: Trechina
- Genus: Masuzonoblemus; Ueno, 1989

Genus of beetles

Masuzonoblemus is a genus in the ground beetle family Carabidae. There are at least two described species in Masuzonoblemus, found in Taiwan.

== Species ==
These two species belong to the genus Masuzonoblemus:

- Masuzonoblemus humeratus Ueno, 1991
- Masuzonoblemus tristis Ueno, 1989
