= Stevensius =

Scientific classification
- Domain: Eukaryota
- Kingdom: Animalia
- Phylum: Arthropoda
- Class: Insecta
- Order: Coleoptera
- Suborder: Adephaga
- Family: Carabidae
- Subfamily: Trechinae
- Tribe: Trechini
- Subtribe: Trechina
- Genus: Stevensius; Jeannel, 1923

Genus of beetles

Stevensius is a genus in the beetle family Carabidae. There are about seven described species in Stevensius, found in India and Nepal.

== Species ==
These seven species belong to the genus Stevensius:

- Stevensius bidulus Deuve & Hodebert, 1991 (Nepal)
- Stevensius brunneoides Deuve, 2001 (India)
- Stevensius brunneus Ueno, 1977 (India)
- Stevensius deharvengi Deuve, 1987 (Nepal)
- Stevensius lampros Jeannel, 1923 (India)
- Stevensius smetanai Deuve, 1988 (Nepal)
- Stevensius striatulus Ueno, 1973 (Nepal)
