= Allegrettia =

Scientific classification
- Domain: Eukaryota
- Kingdom: Animalia
- Phylum: Arthropoda
- Class: Insecta
- Order: Coleoptera
- Suborder: Adephaga
- Family: Carabidae
- Subfamily: Trechinae
- Tribe: Trechini
- Subtribe: Trechina
- Genus: Allegrettia; Jeannel, 1928

Genus of beetles

Allegrettia is a genus in the beetle family Carabidae. There are about six described species in Allegrettia, found in Italy.

== Species ==
These six species belong to the genus Allegrettia:

- Allegrettia bodeii Vailati, 2017
- Allegrettia boldorii Jeannel, 1928
- Allegrettia comottii Monguzzi, 2011
- Allegrettia pavani C.Bari & R.Rossi, 1965
- Allegrettia pedersolii Vailati, 2017
- Allegrettia tacoensis Comotti, 1990
