= Stygiotrechus =

Scientific classification
- Domain: Eukaryota
- Kingdom: Animalia
- Phylum: Arthropoda
- Class: Insecta
- Order: Coleoptera
- Suborder: Adephaga
- Family: Carabidae
- Subfamily: Trechinae
- Tribe: Trechini
- Subtribe: Trechina
- Genus: Stygiotrechus; Ueno, 1958

Genus of beetles

Stygiotrechus is a genus in the beetle family Carabidae. There are more than 20 described species in Stygiotrechus, found in Japan.

== Species ==
These 23 species belong to the genus Stygiotrechus:

- Stygiotrechus azami Ashida & Kitayama, 2004
- Stygiotrechus costicollis Naito, 2017
- Stygiotrechus eos Ueno & Naito, 2003
- Stygiotrechus esakii Ueno, 1969
- Stygiotrechus ikiensis Naito, 2017
- Stygiotrechus itoi Ashida & Kitayama, 2003
- Stygiotrechus iyonis Ueno & Ashida, 2003
- Stygiotrechus izumonis Ueno, 2008
- Stygiotrechus kadanus Ueno, 2001
- Stygiotrechus kitayamai Ueno, 2001
- Stygiotrechus kubotai Ueno, 1958
- Stygiotrechus lampros Naito, 2017
- Stygiotrechus misatonis Ashida & Kitayama, 2003
- Stygiotrechus miyamai Ueno, 2009
- Stygiotrechus miyoshiorum Ueno, 1969
- Stygiotrechus morimotoi Ueno, 1973
- Stygiotrechus nishikawai Ueno, 1980
- Stygiotrechus ohtanii Ueno, 1969
- Stygiotrechus pachys Ueno, 1970
- Stygiotrechus parvulus Ueno, 1969
- Stygiotrechus sasajii Ueno & Naito, 2007
- Stygiotrechus satoui Ueno, 1976
- Stygiotrechus unidentatus Ueno, 1969
