= Ryugadous =

Scientific classification
- Kingdom: Animalia
- Phylum: Arthropoda
- Class: Insecta
- Order: Coleoptera
- Suborder: Adephaga
- Family: Carabidae
- Subfamily: Trechinae
- Tribe: Trechini
- Subtribe: Trechina
- Genus: Ryugadous; Habu, 1950

Subgenera
- Himiseus Ueno, 1969; Ryugadous Habu, 1950; Yuadorgus Ueno, 1955

Genus of beetles

Ryugadous is a genus in the ground beetle family Carabidae. There are about 12 described species in Ryugadous, found in Japan.

== Species ==
These 12 species belong to the genus Ryugadous:

- Ryugadous atorus Ueno, 1965
- Ryugadous awanus Ueno, 1969
- Ryugadous ciliatus Ueno, 1955
- Ryugadous elongatulus Ueno, 1979
- Ryugadous ishikawai Habu, 1950
- Ryugadous kajimotoi Ueno, 1975
- Ryugadous kasaharai Ueno & Y.Ito, 2002
- Ryugadous kiuchii Ueno, 1969
- Ryugadous mimus Ueno, 1965
- Ryugadous pravus Ueno, 1979
- Ryugadous solidior Ueno, 1975
- Ryugadous uozumii (Ueno, 1955)
