= Scotoplanetes =

Scientific classification
- Domain: Eukaryota
- Kingdom: Animalia
- Phylum: Arthropoda
- Class: Insecta
- Order: Coleoptera
- Suborder: Adephaga
- Family: Carabidae
- Subfamily: Trechinae
- Tribe: Trechini
- Subtribe: Trechina
- Genus: Scotoplanetes; Absolon, 1913

Genus of beetles

Scotoplanetes is a genus in the ground beetle family Carabidae. There are at least two described species in Scotoplanetes.

== Species ==
These two species belong to the genus Scotoplanetes:

- Scotoplanetes aquacultor Lakota; Lohaj & Dunay, 2010 ((former) Yugoslavia, Montenegro)
- Scotoplanetes arenstorffianus (Absolon, 1913) (Bosnia-Herzegovina)
