= Paracimmerites =

Scientific classification
- Domain: Eukaryota
- Kingdom: Animalia
- Phylum: Arthropoda
- Class: Insecta
- Order: Coleoptera
- Suborder: Adephaga
- Family: Carabidae
- Tribe: Trechini
- Subtribe: Trechina
- Genus: Paracimmerites; Belousov, 1998
- Species: P. nanus

Binomial name
- Paracimmerites nanus Belousov, 1998

Genus of beetles

Paracimmerites is a genus in the ground beetle family Carabidae. This genus has a single species, Paracimmerites nanus. It is found in Russia.
