= Daiconotrechus =

Scientific classification
- Domain: Eukaryota
- Kingdom: Animalia
- Phylum: Arthropoda
- Class: Insecta
- Order: Coleoptera
- Suborder: Adephaga
- Family: Carabidae
- Subfamily: Trechinae
- Tribe: Trechini
- Subtribe: Trechina
- Genus: Daiconotrechus; Ueno, 1971

Subgenera
- Daiconotrechus Ueno, 1971; Tsuiblemus Ueno, 2007

Genus of beetles

Daiconotrechus is a genus in the beetle family Carabidae. There are at least three described species in Daiconotrechus, found in Japan.

== Species ==
These three species belong to the genus Daiconotrechus:

- Daiconotrechus breviculus Ueno, 2007
- Daiconotrechus iwatai (Ueno, 1970)
- Daiconotrechus tsushimanus Ueno, 2007
