= Oodinotrechus =

Scientific classification
- Domain: Eukaryota
- Kingdom: Animalia
- Phylum: Arthropoda
- Class: Insecta
- Order: Coleoptera
- Suborder: Adephaga
- Family: Carabidae
- Subfamily: Trechinae
- Tribe: Trechini
- Subtribe: Trechina
- Genus: Oodinotrechus; Ueno, 1998

Subgenera
- Oodinotrechus Ueno, 1998; Pingleotrechus Sun & Tian, 2015

Genus of beetles

Oodinotrechus is a genus in the beetle family Carabidae. There are at least three described species in Oodinotrechus, found in China.

== Species ==
These three species belong to the genus Oodinotrechus:

- Oodinotrechus kishimotoi Ueno, 1998
- Oodinotrechus liyoubangi Tian, 2014
- Oodinotrechus yinae Sun & Tian, 2015
