= Canarobius =

Scientific classification
- Domain: Eukaryota
- Kingdom: Animalia
- Phylum: Arthropoda
- Class: Insecta
- Order: Coleoptera
- Suborder: Adephaga
- Family: Carabidae
- Subfamily: Trechinae
- Tribe: Trechini
- Subtribe: Trechodina
- Genus: Canarobius; Machado, 1987

Genus of beetles

Canarobius is a genus in the ground beetle family Carabidae. There are at least two described species in Canarobius, found in the Canary Islands.

== Species ==
These two species belong to the genus Canarobius:

- Canarobius chusyae Machado, 1987
- Canarobius oromii Machado, 1987
