= Sinaphaenops =

Scientific classification
- Domain: Eukaryota
- Kingdom: Animalia
- Phylum: Arthropoda
- Class: Insecta
- Order: Coleoptera
- Suborder: Adephaga
- Family: Carabidae
- Subfamily: Trechinae
- Tribe: Trechini
- Subtribe: Trechina
- Genus: Sinaphaenops; Ueno & Wang, 1991

Subgenera
- Dongaphaenops Deuve & Tian, 2014; Sinaphaenops Ueno & Wang, 1991; Thaumastaphaenops Magrini; Vanni & Zanon, 1997

Genus of beetles

Sinaphaenops is a genus in the beetle family Carabidae. There are about 13 described species in Sinaphaenops, found in China.

== Species ==
These 13 species belong to the genus Sinaphaenops:

- Sinaphaenops banshanicus Chen; Tang; Yang & Tian, 2017
- Sinaphaenops bidraconis Ueno, 2002
- Sinaphaenops chengguangyuani Ma; Huang & Tian, 2020
- Sinaphaenops gracilior Ueno & Ran, 1998
- Sinaphaenops lipoi Chen; Huang & Tian, 2020
- Sinaphaenops mirabilissimus Ueno & Wang, 1991
- Sinaphaenops mochongensis Tian & Huang, 2015
- Sinaphaenops orthogenys Ueno, 2002
- Sinaphaenops pulcherrimus (Magrini; Vanni & Zanon, 1997)
- Sinaphaenops trisetiger Ueno, 2002
- Sinaphaenops wangorum Ueno & Ran, 1998
- Sinaphaenops xuxiakei Deuve & Tian, 2014
- Sinaphaenops yaolinensis Chen; Tang; Yang & Tian, 2017
