= Kettlotrechus =

Scientific classification
- Domain: Eukaryota
- Kingdom: Animalia
- Phylum: Arthropoda
- Class: Insecta
- Order: Coleoptera
- Suborder: Adephaga
- Family: Carabidae
- Subfamily: Trechinae
- Tribe: Trechini
- Subtribe: Trechina
- Genus: Kettlotrechus; Townsend, 2010

Genus of beetles

Kettlotrechus is a genus in the ground beetle family Carabidae. There are about five described species in Kettlotrechus, found in New Zealand.

== Species ==
These five species belong to the genus Kettlotrechus:

- Kettlotrechus edridgeae Townsend, 2010
- Kettlotrechus marchanti Townsend, 2010
- Kettlotrechus millari Townsend, 2010
- Kettlotrechus orpheus (Britton, 1962)
- Kettlotrechus pluto (Britton, 1964)
