= Paraphaenops =

Scientific classification
- Domain: Eukaryota
- Kingdom: Animalia
- Phylum: Arthropoda
- Class: Insecta
- Order: Coleoptera
- Suborder: Adephaga
- Family: Carabidae
- Subfamily: Trechinae
- Tribe: Trechini
- Subtribe: Trechina
- Genus: Paraphaenops; Jeannel, 1916

Genus of beetles

Paraphaenops is a genus in the beetle family Carabidae. There are at least two described species in Paraphaenops, found in Spain.

== Species ==
These two species belong to the genus Paraphaenops:

- Paraphaenops breuilianus (Jeannel, 1916)
- Paraphaenops fadriquei Ortuño & Faille, 2017
