= Shuaphaenops =

Scientific classification
- Domain: Eukaryota
- Kingdom: Animalia
- Phylum: Arthropoda
- Class: Insecta
- Order: Coleoptera
- Suborder: Adephaga
- Family: Carabidae
- Tribe: Trechini
- Subtribe: Trechina
- Genus: Shuaphaenops; Ueno, 1999
- Species: S. parvicollis

Binomial name
- Shuaphaenops parvicollis Ueno, 1999

Genus of beetles

Shuaphaenops is a genus in the ground beetle family Carabidae. This genus has a single species, Shuaphaenops parvicollis. It is found in China.
