= Sardaphaenops =

Scientific classification
- Domain: Eukaryota
- Kingdom: Animalia
- Phylum: Arthropoda
- Class: Insecta
- Order: Coleoptera
- Suborder: Adephaga
- Family: Carabidae
- Subfamily: Trechinae
- Tribe: Trechini
- Subtribe: Trechina
- Genus: Sardaphaenops; Cerruti & Henrot, 1956

Genus of beetles

Sardaphaenops is a genus in the beetle family Carabidae. There are at least two described species in Sardaphaenops.

== Species ==
These two species belong to the genus Sardaphaenops:

- Sardaphaenops adelphus Casale, 2004 (Sardinia, Italy)
- Sardaphaenops supramontanus Cerruti & Henrot, 1956 (Sardinia, Italy)
