= Iberotrechus =

Scientific classification
- Domain: Eukaryota
- Kingdom: Animalia
- Phylum: Arthropoda
- Class: Insecta
- Order: Coleoptera
- Suborder: Adephaga
- Family: Carabidae
- Tribe: Trechini
- Subtribe: Trechina
- Genus: Iberotrechus; Jeannel, 1920
- Species: I. bolivari

Binomial name
- Iberotrechus bolivari (Jeannel, 1913)

Genus of beetles

Iberotrechus is a genus in the ground beetle family Carabidae. This genus has a single species, Iberotrechus bolivari. It is found in Spain.
