= Mexaphaenops =

Scientific classification
- Domain: Eukaryota
- Kingdom: Animalia
- Phylum: Arthropoda
- Class: Insecta
- Order: Coleoptera
- Suborder: Adephaga
- Family: Carabidae
- Subfamily: Trechinae
- Tribe: Trechini
- Subtribe: Trechina
- Genus: Mexaphaenops; Bolivar y Pieltain, 1942

Genus of beetles

Mexaphaenops is a genus in the ground beetle family Carabidae. There are about eight described species in Mexaphaenops, found in Mexico.

== Species ==
These eight species belong to the genus Mexaphaenops:

- Mexaphaenops elegans Barr, 1967
- Mexaphaenops febriculosus Barr, 1982
- Mexaphaenops fiski Barr, 1967
- Mexaphaenops intermedius Barr, 1971
- Mexaphaenops jamesoni Barr, 1982
- Mexaphaenops mackenziei Barr, 1982
- Mexaphaenops prietoi Bolivar y Pieltain, 1942
- Mexaphaenops sulcifrons Barr, 1982
