= Pseudaphaenops =

Scientific classification
- Domain: Eukaryota
- Kingdom: Animalia
- Phylum: Arthropoda
- Class: Insecta
- Order: Coleoptera
- Suborder: Adephaga
- Family: Carabidae
- Subfamily: Trechinae
- Tribe: Trechini
- Subtribe: Trechina
- Genus: Pseudaphaenops; Winkler, 1912

Genus of beetles

Pseudaphaenops is a genus in the ground beetle family Carabidae. There are at least two described species in Pseudaphaenops, found in Ukraine.

== Species ==
These two species belong to the genus Pseudaphaenops:

- Pseudaphaenops jacobsoni (Pliginskiy, 1912)
- Pseudaphaenops tauricus (Winkler, 1912)
