= Goedetrechus =

Scientific classification
- Domain: Eukaryota
- Kingdom: Animalia
- Phylum: Arthropoda
- Class: Insecta
- Order: Coleoptera
- Suborder: Adephaga
- Family: Carabidae
- Subfamily: Trechinae
- Tribe: Trechini
- Subtribe: Trechina
- Genus: Goedetrechus; B.Moore, 1972

Genus of beetles

Goedetrechus is a genus of carabids in the beetle family Carabidae. There are seven described species in Goedetrechus, found in Tasmania, Australia.

Most of the species of this genus are specialized cave-dwellers. Only Goedetrechus talpinus is thought to live in forest litter.

== Species ==
These seven species belong to the genus Goedetrechus:

- Goedetrechus damperi Eberhard & Giachino, 2011
- Goedetrechus florentinus Eberhard & Giachino, 2011
- Goedetrechus mendumae B.Moore, 1972
- Goedetrechus minutus Eberhard & Giachino, 2011
- Goedetrechus parallelus B.Moore, 1972
- Goedetrechus rolani Eberhard & Giachino, 2011
- Goedetrechus talpinus B.Moore, 1972
