= Agonotrechus =

Scientific classification
- Domain: Eukaryota
- Kingdom: Animalia
- Phylum: Arthropoda
- Class: Insecta
- Order: Coleoptera
- Suborder: Adephaga
- Family: Carabidae
- Tribe: Trechini
- Genus: Agonotrechus; Jeannel, 1923

Synonyms
- Paragonotrechus; Bhutanotrechus Ueno, 1977

Genus of beetles

Agonotrechus is a genus of ground beetles in the family Carabidae. There are more than 25 described species in Agonotrechus.

== Species ==
These 27 species belong to the genus Agonotrechus:

- Agonotrechus amplicollis Ueno, 1999
- Agonotrechus andrewesi Jeannel, 1923
- Agonotrechus apterus (Belousov & Kabak, 2003)
- Agonotrechus birmanicus (Bates, 1892)
- Agonotrechus campanulatus Ueno, 1999
- Agonotrechus dubius Belousov & Kabak, 2003
- Agonotrechus farkaci (Deuve, 1995)
- Agonotrechus fugongensis Deuve & Liang, 2016
- Agonotrechus horni Jedlicka, 1932
- Agonotrechus iris Andrewes, 1935
- Agonotrechus laticollis (Ueno & Yu, 1997)
- Agonotrechus lunanshanus Belousov & Kabak, 2003
- Agonotrechus nomurai Ueno, 1999
- Agonotrechus paradoxus (Ueno, 1981)
- Agonotrechus reflexicollis (Ueno, 1977)
- Agonotrechus sichuanicola (Deuve, 1989)
- Agonotrechus sinicola Deuve, 1989
- Agonotrechus sinotroglophilus Deuve, 2000
- Agonotrechus spinangulus Belousov & Kabak&Liang, 2019
- Agonotrechus tenuicollis Ueno, 1986
- Agonotrechus tonkinensis Jedlicka, 1939
- Agonotrechus trechoides Belousov & Kabak, 2003
- Agonotrechus ventrosior (Deuve, 1995)
- Agonotrechus vina Ueno, 1999
- Agonotrechus wuyipeng Deuve, 1992
- Agonotrechus xiaoheishan Deuve & Kavanaugh, 2016
- Agonotrechus yunnanus Ueno, 1999
