= Caucasorites =

Scientific classification
- Kingdom: Animalia
- Phylum: Arthropoda
- Class: Insecta
- Order: Coleoptera
- Suborder: Adephaga
- Family: Carabidae
- Subfamily: Trechinae
- Tribe: Trechini
- Subtribe: Trechina
- Genus: Caucasorites; Belousov & Zamotajlov, 1997

Genus of beetles

Caucasorites is a genus in the ground beetle family Carabidae. There are at least three described species in Caucasorites, found in Russia.

== Species ==
These three species belong to the genus Caucasorites:

- Caucasorites kovali Belousov, 1999
- Caucasorites shchurovi Belousov & Zamotajlov, 1997
- Caucasorites victori Belousov, 1999
