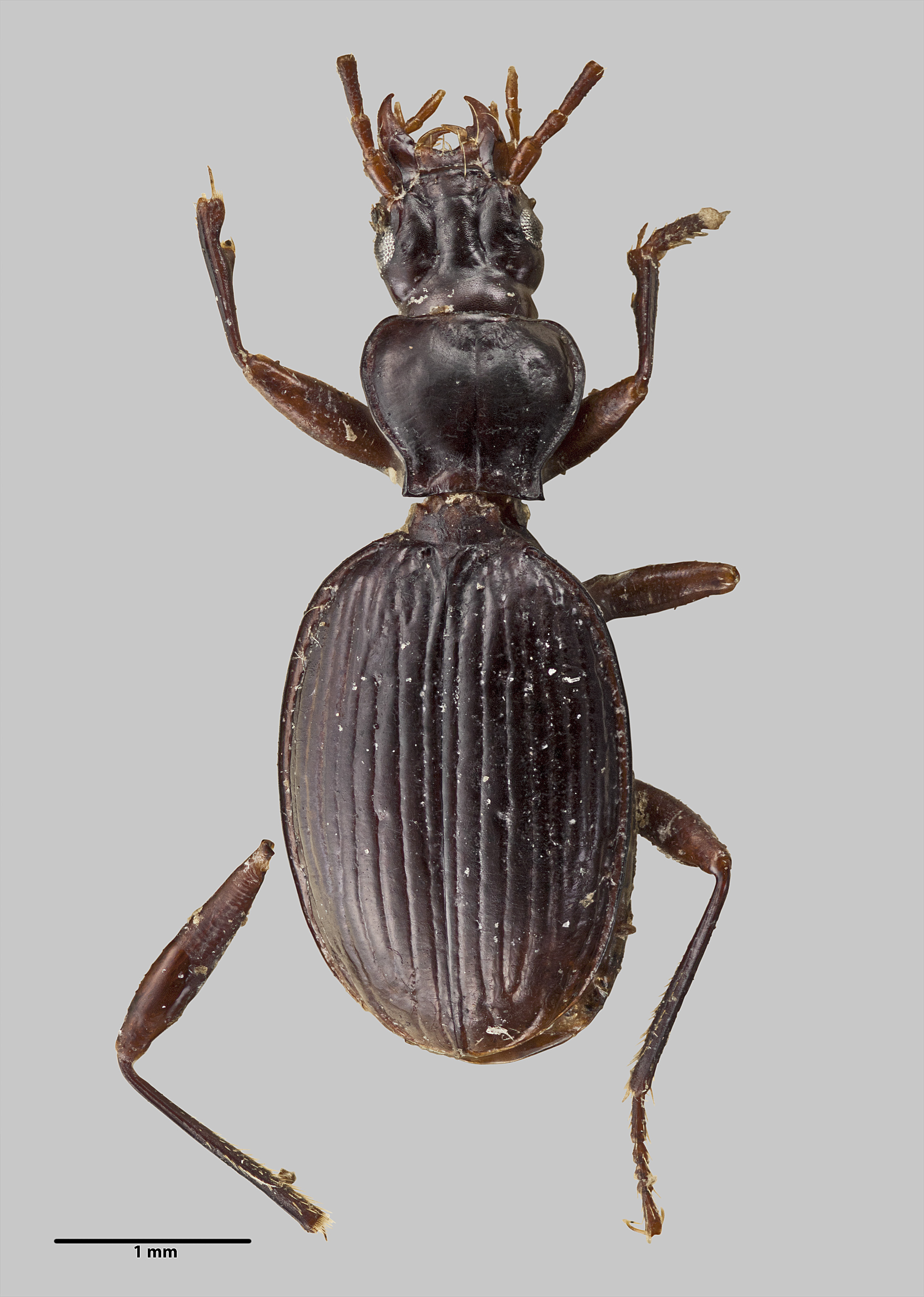
- Male holotype specimen of Duvaliomimus watti held at the Auckland War Memorial Museum.

Scientific classification
- Domain: Eukaryota
- Kingdom: Animalia
- Phylum: Arthropoda
- Class: Insecta
- Order: Coleoptera
- Suborder: Adephaga
- Family: Carabidae
- Subfamily: Trechinae
- Tribe: Trechini
- Subtribe: Trechina
- Genus: Duvaliomimus; Jeannel, 1928

Subgenera
- Duvaliomimus Jeannel, 1928; Mayotrechus Townsend, 2010

= Duvaliomimus =

Genus of beetles

Duvaliomimus is a genus in the beetle family Carabidae. There are about 13 described species in Duvaliomimus, found in New Zealand.

== Species ==
These 13 species belong to the genus Duvaliomimus:

- Duvaliomimus australis Townsend, 2010
- Duvaliomimus chrystallae Townsend, 2010
- Duvaliomimus crypticus Townsend, 2010
- Duvaliomimus maori (Jeannel, 1920)
- Duvaliomimus mayae Britton, 1958
- Duvaliomimus megawattus Townsend, 2010
- Duvaliomimus obscurus Townsend, 2010
- Duvaliomimus orientalis Giachino, 2005
- Duvaliomimus pseudostyx Townsend, 2010
- Duvaliomimus styx Britton, 1959
- Duvaliomimus taieriensis Townsend, 2010
- Duvaliomimus walkeri (Broun, 1903)
- Duvaliomimus watti Britton, 1958
