= Acheroniotes =

Scientific classification
- Kingdom: Animalia
- Phylum: Arthropoda
- Clade: Pancrustacea
- Class: Insecta
- Order: Coleoptera
- Suborder: Adephaga
- Family: Carabidae
- Subfamily: Trechinae
- Tribe: Trechini
- Subtribe: Trechina
- Genus: Acheroniotes; Lohaj & Lakota, 2010

Genus of beetles

Acheroniotes is a genus in the beetle family Carabidae. There are at least three described species in Acheroniotes.

== Species ==
These three species belong to the genus Acheroniotes:

- Acheroniotes golovranicensis Lohaj & Mlejnek, 2012 (Bosnia-Herzegovina)
- Acheroniotes lethensis S.CURCIC & PAVICEVIC, 2018 (former Yugoslavia and Serbia)
- Acheroniotes mlejneki Lohaj & Lakota, 2010 (former Yugoslavia and Montenegro)
