= Zhijinaphaenops =

Scientific classification
- Domain: Eukaryota
- Kingdom: Animalia
- Phylum: Arthropoda
- Class: Insecta
- Order: Coleoptera
- Suborder: Adephaga
- Family: Carabidae
- Subfamily: Trechinae
- Tribe: Trechini
- Genus: Zhijinaphaenops; Uéno & Ran, 2002

Genus of beetles

Zhijinaphaenops is a genus of beetles in the family Carabidae, first described by Shun-Ichi Uéno and Jing-Cheng Ran in 2002. They are found in China.

== Species ==
These nine species belong to the genus Zhijinaphaenops:

- Zhijinaphaenops gravidulus Ueno & Ran, 2002
- Zhijinaphaenops haozhicus Deuve & Tian, 2018
- Zhijinaphaenops jingliae Deuve & Tian, 2015
- Zhijinaphaenops lii Ueno & Ran, 2002
- Zhijinaphaenops liuae Deuve & Tian, 2015
- Zhijinaphaenops multisetifer Deuve & Tian, 2018
- Zhijinaphaenops pubescens Ueno & Ran, 2002
- Zhijinaphaenops wenganicus Deuve & Tian, 2018
- Zhijinaphaenops zunyicus Deuve & Tian, 2018
