= Cathaiaphaenops =

Scientific classification
- Domain: Eukaryota
- Kingdom: Animalia
- Phylum: Arthropoda
- Class: Insecta
- Order: Coleoptera
- Suborder: Adephaga
- Family: Carabidae
- Subfamily: Trechinae
- Tribe: Trechini
- Subtribe: Trechina
- Genus: Cathaiaphaenops; Deuve, 1996

Genus of beetles

Cathaiaphaenops is a genus in the beetle family Carabidae. There are nine described species in Cathaiaphaenops, found in China.

== Species ==
These nine species belong to the genus Cathaiaphaenops:

- Cathaiaphaenops amplipennis Ueno, 2000
- Cathaiaphaenops chuandongziensis Deuve, 2000
- Cathaiaphaenops cychroides Deuve & Tian, 2016
- Cathaiaphaenops delprati Deuve, 1996
- Cathaiaphaenops draconis Deuve, 2000
- Cathaiaphaenops enshiensis Deuve & Tian, 2016
- Cathaiaphaenops lagredeae Deuve, 2016
- Cathaiaphaenops lynchae Deuve & Tian, 2008
- Cathaiaphaenops vignatagliantii Deuve, 2000
