= Trechosiella =

Scientific classification
- Domain: Eukaryota
- Kingdom: Animalia
- Phylum: Arthropoda
- Class: Insecta
- Order: Coleoptera
- Suborder: Adephaga
- Family: Carabidae
- Subfamily: Trechinae
- Tribe: Trechini
- Subtribe: Trechodina
- Genus: Trechosiella; Jeannel, 1960

Genus of beetles

Trechosiella is a genus in the beetle family Carabidae. There are about six described species in Trechosiella.

== Species ==
These six species belong to the genus Trechosiella:

- Trechosiella basilewskyi Jeannel, 1960 (Tanzania)
- Trechosiella endroedyyoungai Geginat, 2013 (South Africa)
- Trechosiella katicola Jeannel, 1964 (South Africa)
- Trechosiella laetula (Péringuey, 1898) (South Africa)
- Trechosiella oligophthalma Geginat, 2013
- Trechosiella scotti (Jeannel, 1937) (South Africa)
