= Cyphotrechodes =

Scientific classification
- Domain: Eukaryota
- Kingdom: Animalia
- Phylum: Arthropoda
- Class: Insecta
- Order: Coleoptera
- Suborder: Adephaga
- Family: Carabidae
- Subfamily: Trechinae
- Tribe: Trechini
- Subtribe: Trechodina
- Genus: Cyphotrechodes; Jeannel, 1926
- Species: C. gibbipennis

Binomial name
- Cyphotrechodes gibbipennis (Blackburn, 1901)

Genus of beetles

Cyphotrechodes is a genus in the ground beetle family Carabidae. This genus has a single species, Cyphotrechodes gibbipennis, found in Australia.
