= Luzonotrechus =

Scientific classification
- Domain: Eukaryota
- Kingdom: Animalia
- Phylum: Arthropoda
- Class: Insecta
- Order: Coleoptera
- Suborder: Adephaga
- Family: Carabidae
- Subfamily: Trechinae
- Tribe: Trechini
- Subtribe: Trechina
- Genus: Luzonotrechus; Ueno, 1979

Genus of beetles

Luzonotrechus is a genus in the ground beetle family Carabidae. There are about six described species in Luzonotrechus, found in the Philippines.

== Species ==
These six species belong to the genus Luzonotrechus:

- Luzonotrechus bontoc (Darlington, 1959)
- Luzonotrechus muscicola Ueno, 1987
- Luzonotrechus rotundicollis Ueno, 1987
- Luzonotrechus teras Ueno, 1987
- Luzonotrechus tumidulus Ueno, 1979
- Luzonotrechus unipunctatus Ueno, 1979
