= Thalassobius testaceus =

Scientific classification
- Kingdom: Animalia
- Phylum: Arthropoda
- Class: Insecta
- Order: Coleoptera
- Suborder: Adephaga
- Family: Carabidae
- Subfamily: Trechinae
- Tribe: Trechini
- Subtribe: Aepina
- Genus: Thalassobius; Solier, 1849
- Species: T. testaceus

Binomial name
- Thalassobius testaceus Solier, 1849

Genus of beetles

Thalassobius testaceus is a species of beetle in the family Carabidae, the only species in the genus Thalassobius.
