= Junnanotrechus =

Scientific classification
- Domain: Eukaryota
- Kingdom: Animalia
- Phylum: Arthropoda
- Class: Insecta
- Order: Coleoptera
- Suborder: Adephaga
- Family: Carabidae
- Tribe: Trechini
- Genus: Junnanotrechus; Uéno & Yin, 1993

Genus of beetles

Junnanotrechus is a genus of beetle in the family Carabidae that was first described by Uéno & Yin in 1993.

== Species ==
Junnanotrechus contains the following nine species:

- Junnanotrechus baehri Deuve, 2013
- Junnanotrechus elegantulus Belousov & Kabak, 2014
- Junnanotrechus exophtalmus Deuve, 1998
- Junnanotrechus koroleviellus Belousov & Kabak, 2014
- Junnanotrechus microps Uéno & Yin, 1993
- Junnanotrechus oblongus Belousov & Kabak, 2014
- Junnanotrechus schuelkei Belousov & Kabak, 2014
- Junnanotrechus triporus Belousov & Kabak, 2014
- Junnanotrechus wrasei Belousov & Kabak, 2014
