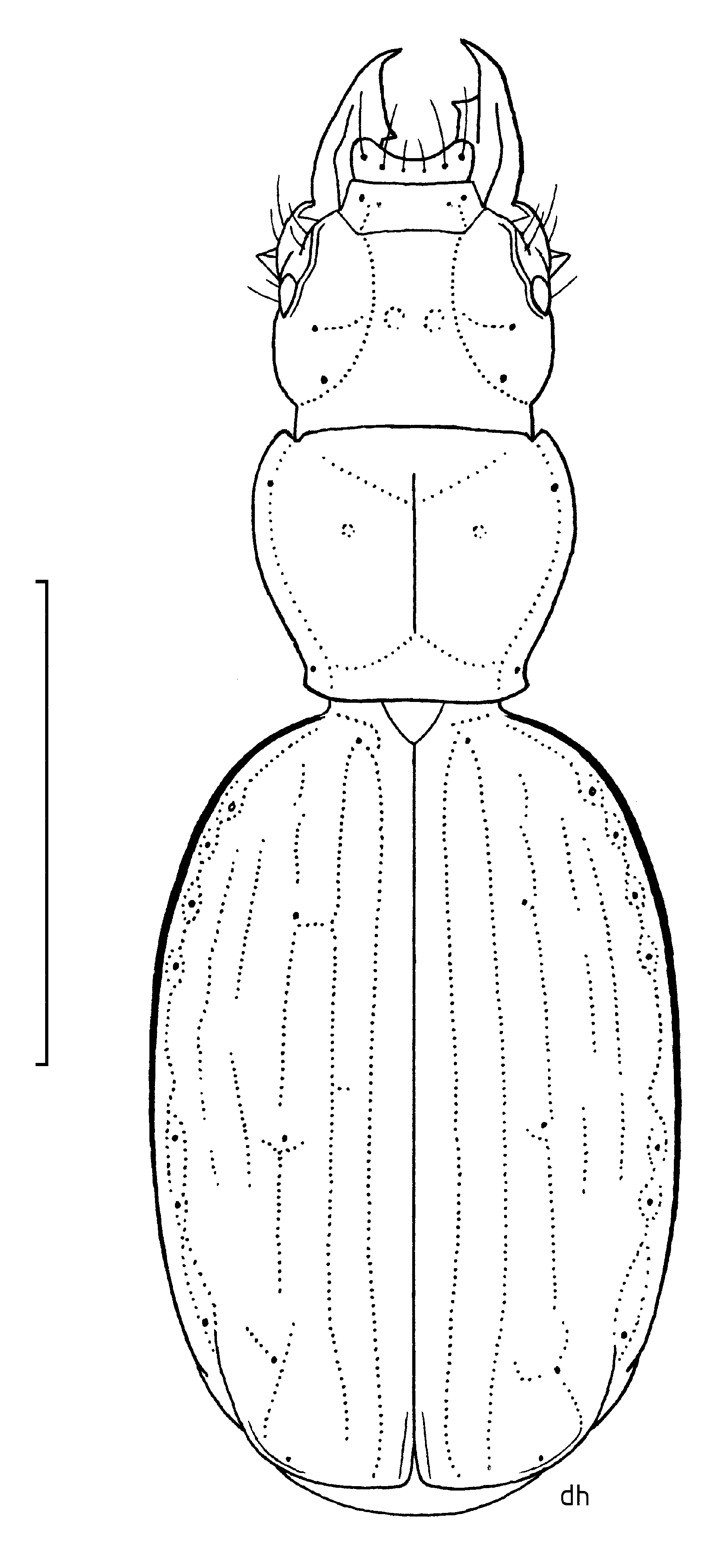
- Illustration of Maoritrechus rangitotoensis, male

Scientific classification
- Domain: Eukaryota
- Kingdom: Animalia
- Phylum: Arthropoda
- Class: Insecta
- Order: Coleoptera
- Suborder: Adephaga
- Family: Carabidae
- Subfamily: Trechinae
- Tribe: Trechini
- Subtribe: Aepina
- Genus: Maoritrechus; Brookes, 1932

= Maoritrechus =

Genus of beetles

Maoritrechus is a genus in the ground beetle family Carabidae. There are at least three described species in Maoritrechus, found in New Zealand.

== Species ==
These three species belong to the genus Maoritrechus:

- Maoritrechus nunni Townsend, 2010
- Maoritrechus rangitotoensis Brookes, 1932
- Maoritrechus stewartensis Townsend, 2010
