= Epaphiopsis =

Scientific classification
- Domain: Eukaryota
- Kingdom: Animalia
- Phylum: Arthropoda
- Class: Insecta
- Order: Coleoptera
- Suborder: Adephaga
- Family: Carabidae
- Subfamily: Trechinae
- Tribe: Trechini
- Subtribe: Trechina
- Genus: Epaphiopsis; Ueno, 1953

Subgenera
- Allepaphiama Ueno & Pawlowski, 1983; Epaphiama Jeannel, 1962; Epaphiopsis Ueno, 1953; Formosiellus Ueno, 1989; Pseudepaphius Ueno, 1962

Genus of beetles

Epaphiopsis is a genus in the beetle family Carabidae. There are more than 70 described species in Epaphiopsis, found in Asia.

== Species ==
These 75 species belong to the genus Epaphiopsis:

- Epaphiopsis alloligops Ueno, 1978 (Japan)
- Epaphiopsis alticola Ueno, 1989 (Taiwan)
- Epaphiopsis apiceplana Ueno, 1989 (Taiwan)
- Epaphiopsis aruna J.Schmidt, 2016 (Nepal)
- Epaphiopsis arunachala J.Schmidt, 2016 (India)
- Epaphiopsis bousqueti (Deuve, 1988) (Nepal)
- Epaphiopsis brevis Ueno, 1978 (Japan)
- Epaphiopsis budhaica (Deuve, 1988) (China)
- Epaphiopsis cavazzutii (Deuve, 1995) (China)
- Epaphiopsis centrosinensis (Deuve, 2004) (China)
- Epaphiopsis chomolungma (Deuve & Queinnec, 1985) (Nepal)
- Epaphiopsis constricta Ueno, 1991 (Taiwan)
- Epaphiopsis dao Ueno, 2006 (China)
- Epaphiopsis davidiani Belousov & Kabak, 2003 (China)
- Epaphiopsis dechangensis Belousov & Kabak, 2003 (China)
- Epaphiopsis divarboris Ueno, 1989 (Taiwan)
- Epaphiopsis elegans Ueno, 1989 (Taiwan)
- Epaphiopsis elongata Ueno, 1962 (Japan)
- Epaphiopsis erlangensis Ueno, 1998 (China)
- Epaphiopsis formosana (Jedlicka, 1946) (Taiwan)
- Epaphiopsis fujii (Suenson, 1957) (Japan)
- Epaphiopsis fukukii Ueno, 1953 (Japan)
- Epaphiopsis ghirettii (Deuve, 1995) (China)
- Epaphiopsis gonggaica (Deuve, 1992) (China)
- Epaphiopsis gracilenta Ueno, 1995 (Japan)
- Epaphiopsis grebennikovi Deuve, 2017 (Taiwan)
- Epaphiopsis hayashii Ueno, 1977 (Japan)
- Epaphiopsis hiekei Belousov & Kabak, 2016 (Vietnam)
- Epaphiopsis himalayica Ueno & Pawlowski, 1983 (Nepal and India)
- Epaphiopsis hsuehshana Ueno, 1989 (Taiwan)
- Epaphiopsis imurai Ueno, 2006 (China)
- Epaphiopsis inconspiqua Belousov & Kabak, 2003 (China)
- Epaphiopsis intermedia Belousov & Kabak, 2003 (China)
- Epaphiopsis ishizuchiensis Ueno, 1962 (Japan)
- Epaphiopsis jacobsoni Sokolov & Shilenkov, 1987 (Kazakhstan)
- Epaphiopsis janoi (Jeannel, 1937) (Japan)
- Epaphiopsis kasaharai Ueno, 1989 (Taiwan)
- Epaphiopsis kongma J.Schmidt, 2016 (Nepal)
- Epaphiopsis korolevi Belousov & Kabak, 2003 (China)
- Epaphiopsis lamellata Ueno & Yu, 1997 (China)
- Epaphiopsis laticollis Belousov & Kabak, 2003 (China)
- Epaphiopsis lunanshana Belousov & Kabak, 2003 (China)
- Epaphiopsis machiko Ueno, 1962 (Japan)
- Epaphiopsis matsudai Ueno, 1962 (Japan)
- Epaphiopsis morimotoi Ueno, 1984 (Japan)
- Epaphiopsis multipunctata Ueno, 1989 (Taiwan)
- Epaphiopsis mumbugiana (Mateu, 1985) (Nepal)
- Epaphiopsis narukawai Morita, 2021 (Japan)
- Epaphiopsis niba Ueno, 1998 (China)
- Epaphiopsis nigra Belousov & Kabak, 2003 (China)
- Epaphiopsis nishikawai Ueno, 1987 (Japan)
- Epaphiopsis notos Ueno, 1991 (Taiwan)
- Epaphiopsis okadai Ueno, 1962 (Japan)
- Epaphiopsis oligops Ueno, 1978 (Japan)
- Epaphiopsis pathibara J.Schmidt, 2016 (Nepal)
- Epaphiopsis perreaui (Deuve, 1988) (China)
- Epaphiopsis polita Belousov & Kabak, 2003 (China)
- Epaphiopsis proxima Belousov & Kabak, 2003 (China)
- Epaphiopsis punctatostriata (Putzeys, 1877) (Japan)
- Epaphiopsis robusta Belousov & Kabak, 2003 (China)
- Epaphiopsis schawalleri (Deuve & Hodebert, 1991) (Nepal)
- Epaphiopsis semenovi (Jeannel, 1962) (Russia)
- Epaphiopsis shibatai Ueno, 1989 (Taiwan)
- Epaphiopsis simbuaensis (Deuve & Hodebert, 1991) (Nepal)
- Epaphiopsis similata Belousov & Kabak, 2003 (China)
- Epaphiopsis sinuata Belousov & Kabak, 2003 (China)
- Epaphiopsis tamurensis (Deuve & Hodebert, 1991) (Nepal)
- Epaphiopsis thorectes (Ueno, 1983) (Nepal)
- Epaphiopsis tronquetiana (Deuve, 1995) (China)
- Epaphiopsis ubaoshana Belousov & Kabak, 2003 (China)
- Epaphiopsis unisetosa Belousov & Kabak, 2003 (China)
- Epaphiopsis unzenensis (Jeannel, 1930) (Japan)
- Epaphiopsis watanabei Ueno, 1962 (Japan)
- Epaphiopsis watanabeorum Ueno, 1975 (Japan)
- Epaphiopsis yushana Ueno, 1989 (Taiwan)
