= Gotoblemus =

Scientific classification
- Domain: Eukaryota
- Kingdom: Animalia
- Phylum: Arthropoda
- Class: Insecta
- Order: Coleoptera
- Suborder: Adephaga
- Family: Carabidae
- Subfamily: Trechinae
- Tribe: Trechini
- Subtribe: Trechina
- Genus: Gotoblemus; Ueno, 1970

Subgenera
- Gotoblemus Ueno, 1970; Kamigotoblemus Naito, 2018

Genus of beetles

Gotoblemus is a genus in the beetle family Carabidae. There are at least three described species in Gotoblemus, found in Japan.

== Species ==
These three species belong to the genus Gotoblemus:

- Gotoblemus exilis Naito, 2018
- Gotoblemus gracilicornis Naito, 2018
- Gotoblemus ii Ueno, 1970
