= Scaurotrechodes =

Scientific classification
- Domain: Eukaryota
- Kingdom: Animalia
- Phylum: Arthropoda
- Class: Insecta
- Order: Coleoptera
- Suborder: Adephaga
- Family: Carabidae
- Subfamily: Trechinae
- Tribe: Trechini
- Subtribe: Trechodina
- Genus: Scaurotrechodes; Geginat, 2006

Genus of beetles

Scaurotrechodes is a genus in the beetle family Carabidae. There are at least three described species in Scaurotrechodes, found in South Africa.

== Species ==
These three species belong to the genus Scaurotrechodes:

- Scaurotrechodes bulirschi Geginat, 2011
- Scaurotrechodes capensis Geginat, 2006
- Scaurotrechodes muellerae Geginat, 2011
