= Himalotrechodes =

Himalotrechodes insignis

Scientific classification
- Kingdom: Animalia
- Phylum: Arthropoda
- Class: Insecta
- Order: Coleoptera
- Suborder: Adephaga
- Family: Carabidae
- Subfamily: Trechinae
- Genus: Himalotrechodes; Ueno, 1981
- Species: H. insignis

Binomial name
- Himalotrechodes insignis Ueno, 1981

Genus of beetles

Himalotrechodes insignis is a species of beetle in the family Carabidae, the only species in the genus Himalotrechodes.
