= Albanotrechus =

Albanotrechus beroni

Scientific classification
- Kingdom: Animalia
- Phylum: Arthropoda
- Class: Insecta
- Order: Coleoptera
- Suborder: Adephaga
- Family: Carabidae
- Subfamily: Trechinae
- Genus: Albanotrechus; Casale & V.B. Gueorguiev, 1994
- Species: A. beroni

Binomial name
- Albanotrechus beroni Casale & V.B. Gueorguiev, 1994

Genus of beetles

Albanotrechus beroni is a species of beetle in the family Carabidae, the only species in the genus Albanotrechus.
