= Pseudocnides =

Scientific classification
- Kingdom: Animalia
- Phylum: Arthropoda
- Class: Insecta
- Order: Coleoptera
- Suborder: Adephaga
- Family: Carabidae
- Subfamily: Trechinae
- Genus: Pseudocnides; Jeannel, 1927

Genus of beetles

Pseudocnides is a genus of beetles in the family Carabidae, containing the following species:

- Pseudocnides orophilus Mateu & Negre, 1972
- Pseudocnides equatorialis Mateu & Negre, 1972
- Pseudocnides patagonicus (Schweiger, 1959)
- Pseudocnides jacquesi Bonniard De Saludo, 1970
- Pseudocnides monolcus (Putzeys, 1870)
- Pseudocnides rugosifrons (Jeannel, 1920)
- Pseudocnides solieri Jeannel, 1954
