= Taurocimmerites =

Taurocimmerites dublanskii

Scientific classification
- Kingdom: Animalia
- Phylum: Arthropoda
- Class: Insecta
- Order: Coleoptera
- Suborder: Adephaga
- Family: Carabidae
- Subfamily: Trechinae
- Genus: Taurocimmerites; Belousov, 1998
- Species: T. dublanskii

Binomial name
- Taurocimmerites dublanskii Belousov, 1998

Genus of beetles

Taurocimmerites dublanskii is a species of beetle in the family Carabidae, the only species in the genus Taurocimmerites.
