= Nannotrechus =

Scientific classification
- Kingdom: Animalia
- Phylum: Arthropoda
- Class: Insecta
- Order: Coleoptera
- Suborder: Adephaga
- Family: Carabidae
- Subfamily: Trechinae
- Genus: Nannotrechus; Winkler, 1926

Genus of beetles

Nannotrechus is a genus of beetles in the family Carabidae, containing the following species:

- Nannotrechus abkhazicus Belousov, 1998
- Nannotrechus ancestralis Belousov, 1998
- Nannotrechus balkaricus Belousov & Kamarov, 1998
- Nannotrechus bzybicus Belousov, 1998
- Nannotrechus ciscaucasiens Ljovuschkin, 1972
- Nannotrechus fishtensis Belousov, 1989
- Nannotrechus gracilipes Belousov, 1998
- Nannotrechus hoppi Winkier, 1926
- Nannotrechus inguricus Belousov, 1998
- Nannotrechus kovali Belousov, 1989
- Nannotrechus marginalis Belousov, 1998
