= Troglocimmerites =

Scientific classification
- Kingdom: Animalia
- Phylum: Arthropoda
- Class: Insecta
- Order: Coleoptera
- Suborder: Adephaga
- Family: Carabidae
- Subfamily: Trechinae
- Genus: Troglocimmerites; Ljovuschkin, 1970

Genus of beetles

Troglocimmerites is a genus of beetles in the family Carabidae, containing the following species:

- Troglocimmerites abashicus Belousov, 1998
- Troglocimmerites angulatus Belousov, 1998
- Troglocimmerites djanaschvilii Ljovuschkin, 1970
- Troglocimmerites imeretinus Dalzhanski & Ljovuschkin, 1985
- Troglocimmerites mingrelicus Belousov, 1998
- Troglocimmerites nakeralae Reitter, 1883
- Troglocimmerites oseticus Belousov, 1998
- Troglocimmerites pasquinii Vigna Taglianti, 1977
- Troglocimmerites pygmaeus Belousov, 1998
- Troglocimmerites suaneticus Reitter, 1877
