= Aputrechisibus =

Aputrechisibus dubius

Scientific classification
- Kingdom: Animalia
- Phylum: Arthropoda
- Class: Insecta
- Order: Coleoptera
- Suborder: Adephaga
- Family: Carabidae
- Subfamily: Trechinae
- Genus: Aputrechisibus; Trezzi, 2007
- Species: A. dubius

Binomial name
- Aputrechisibus dubius Trezzi, 2007

Genus of beetles

Aputrechisibus dubius is a species of beetle in the family Carabidae, the only species in the genus Aputrechisibus.
