= Aepiblemus =

Scientific classification
- Kingdom: Animalia
- Phylum: Arthropoda
- Class: Insecta
- Order: Coleoptera
- Suborder: Adephaga
- Family: Carabidae
- Subfamily: Trechinae
- Genus: Aepiblemus; Belousov & Kabak, 1993

Genus of beetles

Aepiblemus is a genus of beetles in the family Carabidae, containing the following species:

- Aepiblemus caeculus Belousov & Kabak, 1993
- Aepiblemus marginalis Belousov & Kabak, 1997
