= Trechiamiotes =

Trechiamiotes siamensis

Scientific classification
- Kingdom: Animalia
- Phylum: Arthropoda
- Class: Insecta
- Order: Coleoptera
- Suborder: Adephaga
- Family: Carabidae
- Subfamily: Trechinae
- Genus: Trechiamiotes; Deuve, 1998
- Species: T. siamensis

Binomial name
- Trechiamiotes siamensis Peringuey, 1896

Genus of beetles

Trechiamiotes siamensis is a species of beetle in the family Carabidae, the only species in the genus Trechiamiotes. It is found in Thailand.
