= Trechistus =

Scientific classification
- Kingdom: Animalia
- Phylum: Arthropoda
- Class: Insecta
- Order: Coleoptera
- Suborder: Adephaga
- Family: Carabidae
- Subfamily: Trechinae
- Genus: Trechistus; Moore, 1972

Genus of beetles

Trechistus is a genus of beetles in the family Carabidae, containing the following species:

- Trechistus gordoni Eberhard & Giachino, 2011
- Trechistus humicola Moore, 1972
- Trechistus inconspicuus Moore, 1972
- Trechistus stenoderus Moore, 1972
- Trechistus sylvaticus Moore, 1972
- Trechistus terricola Moore, 1972
