= Arctaphaenops =

Scientific classification
- Kingdom: Animalia
- Phylum: Arthropoda
- Class: Insecta
- Order: Coleoptera
- Suborder: Adephaga
- Family: Carabidae
- Subfamily: Trechinae
- Genus: Arctaphaenops; Meixner, 1925

Genus of beetles

Arctaphaenops is a genus of beetles in the family Carabidae, containing the following species:

- Arctaphaenops angulipennis Meixner, 1925
- Arctaphaenops gaisbergeri Fischhuber, 1983
- Arctaphaenops muellneni Schmid, 1972
