= Eutrechopsis =

Eutrechopsis ovalis

Scientific classification
- Kingdom: Animalia
- Phylum: Arthropoda
- Class: Insecta
- Order: Coleoptera
- Suborder: Adephaga
- Family: Carabidae
- Subfamily: Trechinae
- Genus: Eutrechopsis; Moore, 1972
- Species: E. ovalis

Binomial name
- Eutrechopsis ovalis Moore, 1972

Genus of beetles

Eutrechopsis ovalis is a species of beetle in the family Carabidae, the only species in the genus Eutrechopsis.
