= Andinorites =

Scientific classification
- Kingdom: Animalia
- Phylum: Arthropoda
- Class: Insecta
- Order: Coleoptera
- Suborder: Adephaga
- Family: Carabidae
- Subfamily: Trechinae
- Genus: Andinorites; Mateu & Belles, 1980

Genus of beetles

Andinorites is a genus of beetles in the family Carabidae, containing the following species:

- Andinorites atahualpai M.Etonti & Mateu, 2000
- Andinorites convexus Mateu & Belles, 1980
- Andinorites crypticola Mateu & Belles, 1980
- Andinorites peruvianus Mateu & Belles, 1980
- Andinorites striatus Mateu & Belles, 1980
- Andinorites troglophilus Mateu & Belles, 1980
- Andinorites vilchezi Mateu & Belles, 1980
