= Temnostega =

Temnostega antarctica

Scientific classification
- Kingdom: Animalia
- Phylum: Arthropoda
- Class: Insecta
- Order: Coleoptera
- Suborder: Adephaga
- Family: Carabidae
- Subfamily: Trechinae
- Genus: Temnostega; Enderlein, 1905
- Species: T. antarctica

Binomial name
- Temnostega antarctica Enderlein, 1905

Genus of beetles

Temnostega antarctica is a species of beetle in the family Carabidae, the only species in the genus Temnostega.
