= Anillidius =

Scientific classification
- Kingdom: Animalia
- Phylum: Arthropoda
- Class: Insecta
- Order: Coleoptera
- Suborder: Adephaga
- Family: Carabidae
- Subfamily: Trechinae
- Genus: Anillidius; Jeannel, 1928

Genus of beetles

Anillidius is a genus of beetles in the family Carabidae, containing the following species:

- Anillidius byzantinus Casale, M. Elonti & Giachino, 1992
- Anillidius coiffaiti Jeannel, 1955
- Anillidius hobhousae Jeannel, 1930
- Anillidius pisidicus Jeannel, 1937
- Anillidius tauricus Jeannel, 1930
- Anillidius turcicus J. Frivaldszky, 1880
- Anillidius uludagensis Schweiger, 1965
