= Boreaphaenops =

Scientific classification
- Kingdom: Animalia
- Phylum: Arthropoda
- Class: Insecta
- Order: Coleoptera
- Suborder: Adephaga
- Family: Carabidae
- Subfamily: Trechinae
- Genus: Boreaphaenops; Ueno, 2002

Genus of beetles

Boreaphaenops is a genus of beetles in the family Carabidae, containing the following species:

- Boreaphaenops angustus Ueno, 2002
- Boreaphaenops hirundinis Ueno, 2005
