= Trechobembix =

Trechobembix baldiensis

Scientific classification
- Kingdom: Animalia
- Phylum: Arthropoda
- Class: Insecta
- Order: Coleoptera
- Suborder: Adephaga
- Family: Carabidae
- Subfamily: Trechinae
- Genus: Trechobembix; Jeannel, 1926
- Species: T. baldiensis

Binomial name
- Trechobembix baldiensis (Blackburn, 1894)

Genus of beetles

Trechobembix is a genus of in the beetle family Carabidae. This genus has a single species, Trechobembix baldiensis, found in Australia.
