= Thalassoduvalius =

Thalassoduvalius masidai

Scientific classification
- Kingdom: Animalia
- Phylum: Arthropoda
- Class: Insecta
- Order: Coleoptera
- Suborder: Adephaga
- Family: Carabidae
- Subfamily: Trechinae
- Genus: Thalassoduvalius; Ueno, 1956
- Species: T. masidai

Binomial name
- Thalassoduvalius masidai Ueno, 1956

Genus of beetles

Thalassoduvalius masidai is a species of beetle in the family Carabidae, the only species in the genus Thalassoduvalius. It is found in Japan.
