= Vietotrechus =

Vietotrechus minutissimus

Scientific classification
- Kingdom: Animalia
- Phylum: Arthropoda
- Class: Insecta
- Order: Coleoptera
- Suborder: Adephaga
- Family: Carabidae
- Subfamily: Trechinae
- Genus: Vietotrechus; Ueno, 1995
- Species: V. minutissimus

Binomial name
- Vietotrechus minutissimus Ueno, 1995

Genus of beetles

Vietotrechus minutissimus is a species of beetles in the family Carabidae, the only species in the genus Vietotrechus.
