= Toshiaphaenops =

Scientific classification
- Kingdom: Animalia
- Phylum: Arthropoda
- Class: Insecta
- Order: Coleoptera
- Suborder: Adephaga
- Family: Carabidae
- Subfamily: Trechinae
- Genus: Toshiaphaenops; Ueno, 1999

Genus of beetles

Toshiaphaenops is a genus of beetles in the family Carabidae, containing the following species. They are found in China.

- Toshiaphaenops globipennis Ueno, 1999
- Toshiaphaenops ovicollis Ueno, 1999
