= Accoella =

Scientific classification
- Kingdom: Animalia
- Phylum: Arthropoda
- Class: Insecta
- Order: Coleoptera
- Suborder: Adephaga
- Family: Carabidae
- Subfamily: Trechinae
- Genus: Accoella; Ueno, 1990

Genus of beetles

Accoella is a genus of beetles in the family Carabidae, containing the following species:

- Accoella akirai Ueno, 1990
- Accoella thermalis Ueno, 1995
