= Ameroduvalius =

Ameroduvalius jeanneli

Scientific classification
- Kingdom: Animalia
- Phylum: Arthropoda
- Class: Insecta
- Order: Coleoptera
- Suborder: Adephaga
- Family: Carabidae
- Subfamily: Trechinae
- Genus: Ameroduvalius; Valentine, 1952
- Species: A. jeanneli

Binomial name
- Ameroduvalius jeanneli Valentine, 1952

Genus of beetles

Ameroduvalius jeanneli is a species of beetle in the family Carabidae, the only species in the genus Ameroduvalius.
