= Trechimorphus =

Scientific classification
- Kingdom: Animalia
- Phylum: Arthropoda
- Class: Insecta
- Order: Coleoptera
- Suborder: Adephaga
- Family: Carabidae
- Subfamily: Trechinae
- Genus: Trechimorphus; Jeannel, 1927

Genus of beetles

Trechimorphus is a genus of beetles in the family Carabidae, containing the following species:

- Trechimorphus apterus Moore, 1972
- Trechimorphus brunneus Moore, 1972
- Trechimorphus diemenensis (Bates, 1878)
- Trechimorphus semipunctatus Moore, 1972
- Trechimorphus solidior (Blackburn, 1901)
- Trechimorphus westraliensis Moore, 1972
