= Agostinia =

Scientific classification
- Kingdom: Animalia
- Phylum: Arthropoda
- Class: Insecta
- Order: Coleoptera
- Suborder: Adephaga
- Family: Carabidae
- Subfamily: Trechinae
- Genus: Agostinia; Jeannel, 1928

Synonyms
- Luraphaenops

Genus of beetles

Agostinia is a genus of beetles in the family Carabidae, containing the following species:

- Agostinia gaudini Jeannel, 1952
- Agostinia gineti Jeannel, 1955
- Agostinia launi Gestro, 1892
