= Amblystogenium =

Scientific classification
- Kingdom: Animalia
- Phylum: Arthropoda
- Class: Insecta
- Order: Coleoptera
- Suborder: Adephaga
- Family: Carabidae
- Subfamily: Trechinae
- Genus: Amblystogenium; Enderlein, 1905

Genus of beetles

Amblystogenium is a genus of beetles in the family Carabidae, containing the following species:

- Amblystogenium minimum Luff, 1972
- Amblystogenium pacificum (Putzeys, 1869)
