= Apocimmerites =

Scientific classification
- Kingdom: Animalia
- Phylum: Arthropoda
- Class: Insecta
- Order: Coleoptera
- Suborder: Adephaga
- Family: Carabidae
- Subfamily: Trechinae
- Genus: Apocimmerites; Belousov, 1998

Genus of beetles

Apocimmerites is a genus of beetles in the family Carabidae, containing the following species:

- Apocimmerites kubanicus Belousov, 1998
- Apocimmerites parallelus Belousov, 1998
