= Moline Universal Tractors =

Defunct American football team

General information
- Founded: 1920
- Folded: 1920
- Stadium: Browning Field
- Headquartered: Moline, Illinois

Personnel
- Head coach: Ted Davenport

League / conference affiliations
- Independent (1920)

The Moline Universal Tractors, also known as the Moline Athletics, were an independent American football team that played in 1920. Although an independent, they played in two games that were recorded in the National Football League (NFL), against the Decatur Staleys and Chicago Cardinals. Overall, the Universal Tractors played seven games during their only season of existence, and compiled a record of 2–5. They were intended to be a works team sponsored by the workers of the Universal Tractor Co factory, but for unknown reasons no money ended up being collected and the name was changed to the Athletics.

The two matches that were entered into recorded NFL statistics were a 0-20 loss to the Decatur Staleys on October 3, 1920 and a 3-33 loss to the Chicago Cardinals on October 17, 1920. Statistical references recorded the second game as a 33 to 0 shutout until 2025, when sports writer Jon Bois, in the process of creating a video documenting the history of NFL scorigami for the Secret Base YouTube channel, discovered contemporary news reports stated that a player named Donovan had made a 3 point drop kick during the 3rd quarter.

In 2017, there was a throwback game to celebrate football history that had the Universal Tractors play the Rock Island Independents.
