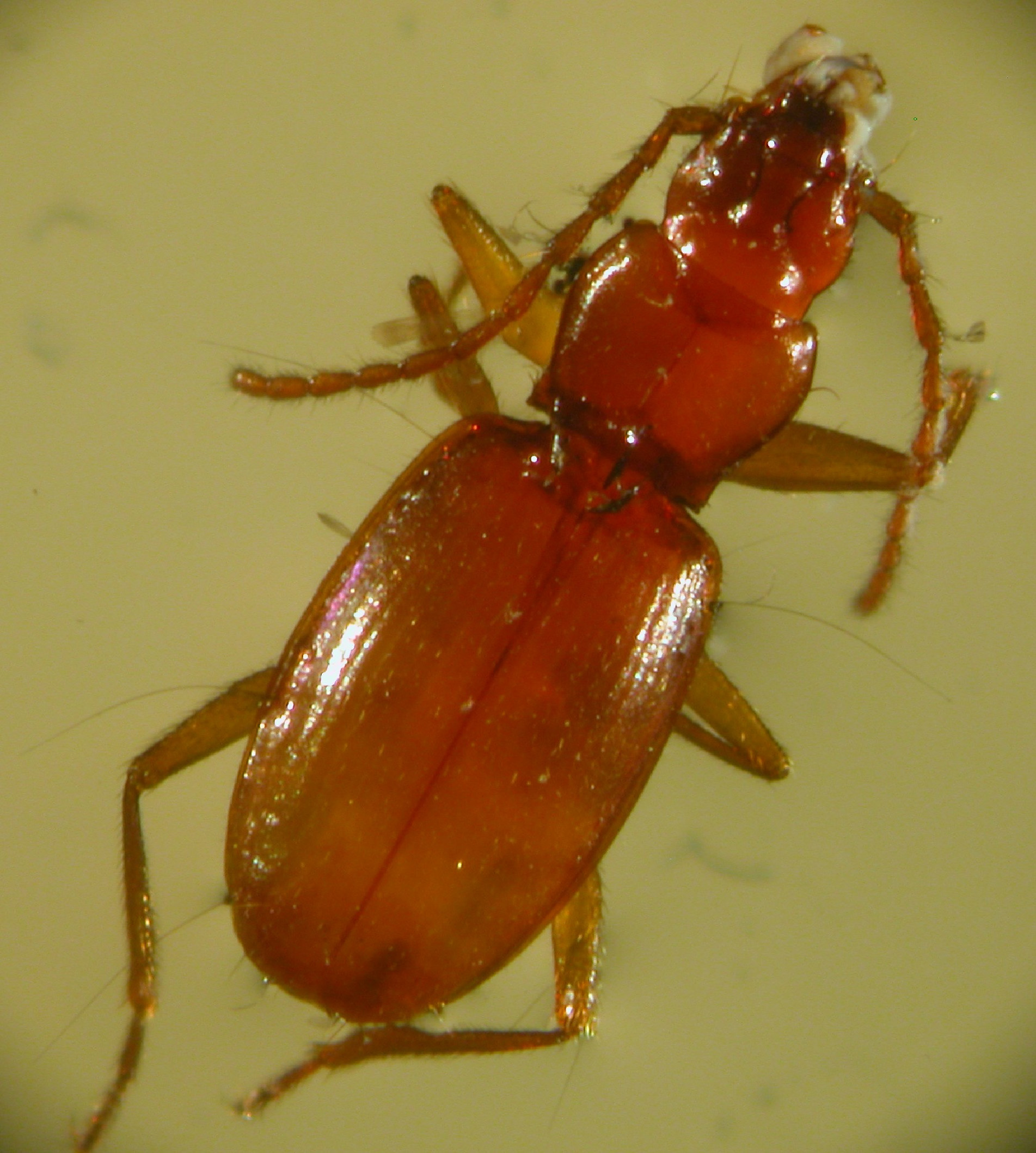
- Pseudanophthalmus major

Scientific classification
- Kingdom: Animalia
- Phylum: Arthropoda
- Class: Insecta
- Order: Coleoptera
- Suborder: Adephaga
- Family: Carabidae
- Subfamily: Trechinae
- Tribe: Trechini
- Subtribe: Trechina
- Genus: Pseudanophthalmus; Jeannel, 1920

= Pseudanophthalmus =

Genus of beetles

Pseudanophthalmus is a genus of carabid beetle. Over 200 species have been described in the caves of ten states of the eastern United States.

== Taxonomy ==
The genus was first named and described by René Jeannel in 1920. Along with the monobasic genus Neaphaenops (also Jeannel) from Kentucky caves, the dibasic genus Nelsonites (Valentine) from Tennessee and Kentucky, and Trechoblemus of Eurasia and North America (Ganglbauer), it forms the “Trechoblemus complex”.

== Species ==
- Pseudanophthalmus acherontis Barr, 1959
- Pseudanophthalmus alabamae Valentine, 1932
- Pseudanophthalmus assimilis Barr, 1981
- Pseudanophthalmus audax (G.Horn, 1883)
- Pseudanophthalmus avernus Valentine, 1945
- Pseudanophthalmus barberi Jeannel, 1928
- Pseudanophthalmus barri Krekeler, 1973
- Pseudanophthalmus beaklei Valentine, 1937
- Pseudanophthalmus bendermani Barr, 1959
- Pseudanophthalmus brevis Valentine, 1932
- Pseudanophthalmus calcareus Barr, 1981
- Pseudanophthalmus catherinae Barr, 1959
- Pseudanophthalmus catoryctos Krekeler, 1973
- Pseudanophthalmus cerberus Barr, 1985
- Pseudanophthalmus chthonius Krekeler, 1973
- Pseudanophthalmus ciliaris Valentine, 1937
- Pseudanophthalmus cnephosus Krekeler, 1973
- Pseudanophthalmus conditus Krekeler, 1973
- Pseudanophthalmus cordicollis Barr, 1981
- Pseudanophthalmus cumberlandus Valentine, 1937
- Pseudanophthalmus darlingtoni Barr, 1985
- Pseudanophthalmus deceptivus Barr, 1981
- Pseudanophthalmus delicatus Valentine, 1932
- Pseudanophthalmus desertus Krekeler, 1973
- Pseudanophthalmus digitus Valentine, 1932
- Pseudanophthalmus egberti Barr, 1965
- Pseudanophthalmus elevatus Valentine, 1932
- Pseudanophthalmus elongatus Krekeler, 1973
- Pseudanophthalmus emersoni Krekeler, 1958
- Pseudanophthalmus engelhardti (Barber, 1928)
- Pseudanophthalmus eremita (G.Horn, 1871)
- Pseudanophthalmus exiguus Krekeler, 1973
- Pseudanophthalmus exoticus Krekeler, 1973
- Pseudanophthalmus farrelli Barr, 1959
- Pseudanophthalmus fastigatus Barr, 1981
- Pseudanophthalmus fowlerae Barr, 1980
- Pseudanophthalmus frigidus Barr, 1981
- Pseudanophthalmus fulleri Valentine, 1932
- Pseudanophthalmus fuscus Valentine, 1931
- Pseudanophthalmus georgiae Barr, 1981
- Pseudanophthalmus globiceps Barr, 1985
- Pseudanophthalmus gracilis Valentine, 1931
- Pseudanophthalmus grandis Valentine, 1931
- Pseudanophthalmus hadenoecus Barr, 1965
- Pseudanophthalmus henroti Jeannel, 1949
- Pseudanophthalmus hesperus Barr, 1959
- Pseudanophthalmus higginbothami Valentine, 1931
- Pseudanophthalmus hirsutus Valentine, 1931
- Pseudanophthalmus hoffmani Barr, 1965
- Pseudanophthalmus holsingeri Barr, 1965
- Pseudanophthalmus horni (Garman, 1892)
- Pseudanophthalmus hortulanus Barr, 1965
- Pseudanophthalmus hubbardi (Barber, 1928)
- Pseudanophthalmus hubrichti Valentine, 1948
- Pseudanophthalmus humeralis Valentine, 1931
- Pseudanophthalmus hypertrichosis Valentine, 1932
- Pseudanophthalmus hypolithos Barr, 1981
- Pseudanophthalmus illinoisensis Barr & Peck, 1966
- Pseudanophthalmus inexpectatus Barr, 1959
- Pseudanophthalmus inquisitor Barr, 1980
- Pseudanophthalmus insularis Barr, 1959
- Pseudanophthalmus intermedius (Valentine, 1931)
- Pseudanophthalmus intersectus Barr, 1965
- Pseudanophthalmus jonesi Valentine, 1945
- Pseudanophthalmus krameri Krekeler, 1973
- Pseudanophthalmus krekeleri Barr, 1965
- Pseudanophthalmus lallemanti Jeannel, 1949
- Pseudanophthalmus leonae Barr, 1960
- Pseudanophthalmus limicola Jeannel, 1931
- Pseudanophthalmus loedingi Valentine, 1931
- Pseudanophthalmus loganensis Barr, 1959
- Pseudanophthalmus longiceps Barr, 1981
- Pseudanophthalmus macradei Valentine, 1948
- Pseudanophthalmus menetriesii (Motschulsky, 1862)
- Pseudanophthalmus montanus Barr, 1965
- Pseudanophthalmus nelsoni Barr, 1965
- Pseudanophthalmus nickajackensis Barr, 1981
- Pseudanophthalmus nortoni Barr, 1981
- Pseudanophthalmus occidentalis Barr, 1959
- Pseudanophthalmus ohioensis Krekeler, 1973
- Pseudanophthalmus orthosulcatus Valentine, 1932
- Pseudanophthalmus packardi Barr, 1959
- Pseudanophthalmus pallidus Barr, 1981
- Pseudanophthalmus paradoxus Barr, 1981
- Pseudanophthalmus parvicollis Jeannel, 1931
- Pseudanophthalmus parvus Krekeler, 1973 (presumed extinct as of 2016)
- Pseudanophthalmus paulus Barr, 1981
- Pseudanophthalmus paynei Barr, 1981
- Pseudanophthalmus petrunkevitchi Valentine, 1945
- Pseudanophthalmus pholeter Krekeler, 1973
- Pseudanophthalmus pilosus Barr, 1985
- Pseudanophthalmus pontis Barr, 1965
- Pseudanophthalmus potomacus Valentine, 1932
- Pseudanophthalmus praetermissus Barr, 1981
- Pseudanophthalmus princeps Barr, 1979
- Pseudanophthalmus productus Barr, 1980
- Pseudanophthalmus pubescens (G.Horn, 1868)
- Pseudanophthalmus punctatus Valentine, 1931
- Pseudanophthalmus pusillus Barr, 1981
- Pseudanophthalmus pusio (G.Horn, 1868)
- Pseudanophthalmus puteanus Krekeler, 1973
- Pseudanophthalmus quadratus Barr, 1965
- Pseudanophthalmus rittmani Krekeler, 1973
- Pseudanophthalmus robustus Valentine, 1931
- Pseudanophthalmus rogersae Barr, 1981
- Pseudanophthalmus rotundatus Valentine, 1932
- Pseudanophthalmus sanctipauli Barr, 1981
- Pseudanophthalmus scholasticus Barr, 1981
- Pseudanophthalmus scutilus Barr, 1981
- Pseudanophthalmus seclusus Barr, 1981
- Pseudanophthalmus sequoyah Barr, 1981
- Pseudanophthalmus sericus Barr, 1981
- Pseudanophthalmus shilohensis Krekeler, 1958
- Pseudanophthalmus sidus Barr, 1965
- Pseudanophthalmus simplex Barr, 1980
- Pseudanophthalmus simulans Barr, 1985
- Pseudanophthalmus solivagus Krekeler, 1973
- Pseudanophthalmus steevesi Barr, 1981
- Pseudanophthalmus striatus (Motschulsky, 1862)
- Pseudanophthalmus stricticollis Jeannel, 1931
- Pseudanophthalmus sylvaticus Barr, 1967
- Pseudanophthalmus templetoni Valentine, 1948
- Pseudanophthalmus tenebrosus Krekeler, 1973
- Pseudanophthalmus tenesensis Valentine, 1937
- Pseudanophthalmus tenuis (G.Horn, 1871)
- Pseudanophthalmus thomasi Barr, 1981
- Pseudanophthalmus tiresias Barr, 1959
- Pseudanophthalmus transfluvialis Barr, 1985
- Pseudanophthalmus troglodytes Krekeler, 1973
- Pseudanophthalmus tullahoma Barr, 1959
- Pseudanophthalmus umbratilis Krekeler, 1973
- Pseudanophthalmus unionis Barr, 1981
- Pseudanophthalmus valentinei Jeannel, 1949
- Pseudanophthalmus vanburenensis Barr, 1959
- Pseudanophthalmus ventus Barr, 1981
- Pseudanophthalmus vicarius Barr, 1965
- Pseudanophthalmus virginicus (Barr, 1960)
- Pseudanophthalmus wallacei Barr, 1981
- Pseudanophthalmus youngi Krekeler, 1958
