= Crashing the Gate =

Crashing the Gate: Netroots, Grassroots, and the Rise of People Powered Politics
- Author: Jerome Armstrong, Markos Moulitsas
- Language: English
- Subject: American politics
- Publisher: Chelsea Green
- Publication date: March 1, 2006
- Publication place: United States
- Media type: Hardcover
- Pages: 208
- ISBN: 1-931498-99-7
- OCLC: 62697103
- Dewey Decimal: 324.70973 22
- LC Class: JK1764 .A76 2006
- Followed by: Taking On the System: Rules for Radical Change in a Digital Era

Crashing the Gate: Netroots, Grassroots, and the Rise of People Powered Politics is a book (ISBN 1-931498-99-7) authored by American political bloggers Markos Moulitsas of Daily Kos and Jerome Armstrong of MyDD, published in 2006 by Chelsea Green.

== Summary ==
In this book, the authors document what they see as the ineffectiveness of "old-school politics" in the Democratic Party, and advocate for a "new kind of popular political movement" that combines the netroots, grassroots, labor unions and big donors to effect a "broad change in the political landscape" of the United States.

In one chapter, they argue that there are two models for Democratic candidate success in the future. One is to keep interest groups at bay, as exemplified by the 2004 electoral victory of Montana governor Brian Schweitzer. The other is to bring disparate interest groups together, as exemplified by the alliance of Colorado Democrats who succeeded in winning back the state legislature, several Congressional districts, and a seat in the United States Senate.

== Publication data ==
- Crashing the Gate: Netroots, Grassroots, and the Rise of People Powered Politics. (2006) Chelsea Green, ISBN 1-931498-99-7.

== Related books ==
- Taking On the System: Rules for Radical Change in a Digital Era
