= Chris Bowers =

American blogger

Chris Bowers (born January 23, 1974) is a blogger for DailyKos and a manager of their email list. He was a blogger and co-founder of OpenLeft, and was until July 2007 a front-page blogger for MyDD. His focus is on polling and data-driven analysis of US politics, as well as of the blogosphere.

Bowers was a member of the Pennsylvania State Democratic Committee, representing the 8th district of the Pennsylvania State Senate, and a former resident of Philadelphia. Now he resides in Washington D.C. He is a former union organizer, and a strong supporter of organized labor.

Bowers has overseen netroots surveys that he says demonstrate that progressive Internet activists are driven more by partisanship and pragmatism than far-left ideology, and that show bloggers are influential on rank and file Democrats.

== John Edwards Staff-Blogger Controversy ==
In February 2007, Bowers stated "I have a pretty vicious rant and an important action alert lined up, but I am waiting to hear from the Edwards camp ...". about the controversy over bloggers Amanda Marcotte and Melissa McEwan, recently hired by John Edwards. When Edwards announced he would not fire the bloggers, Bowers announced he considered the event significant enough to tip him into supporting Edwards in the 2008 Democratic Presidential primary. Further, he initiated a blogger campaign to email traditional media outlets with additional facts about William Donohue and the blogger employed by Republican Presidential candidate John McCain, Patrick J. Hynes. Bowers reported some success in these efforts in that several media outlets (including the Associated Press) did report on the items Bowers suggested were relevant.

== Other notable activities ==
In 2006, Bowers and Matt Stoller took over BlogPAC from Markos Moulitsas and Jerome Armstrong. BlogPAC was active until 2012.

During the 2006 election, Bowers again came into the spotlight for two internet campaigns he initiated. The first was called "Use It or Lose It" where he and other bloggers analyzed the FEC reports for "safe" Democrats and implored them to donate some of their campaign finance reserves to other Democratic candidates in more competitive elections. As a result of this campaign, several Democrats did donate additional money, including John Kerry and Barney Frank. Bowers estimated the effort generated a minimum of $2.3 million for Democrats in competitive campaigns from "safe" Democrats.

The second campaign in 2006 was a Google bomb (or less pejoratively, a "search engine optimization") campaign against a list of Republican candidates. The idea was to elevate perceived negative stories in traditional media outlets about these candidates in Google searches. Bowers attempted to distinguish this from other well-known Google bombs, such as Miserable Failure or Flip Flop search terms returning biographies of George W. Bush and John Kerry during the 2004 election, by returning only serious and factual articles about the targets. .

Bowers is a Fellow at the Commonweal Institute.
