= BlogPAC =

Political action committee

BlogPAC was a political action committee founded in 2004 by Markos Moulitsas and Jerome Armstrong focused on progressive bloggers and politics online. In 2006, Chris Bowers and Matt Stoller took over BlogPAC from Moulitsas and Armstrong. Instead of channeling money to electoral campaigns, the mission was refocused "to defend the netroots and improve the quality of online activism". In 2007 BlogPAC organized progressive bloggers in several states, and offered microgrants to progressive bloggers through the 50 State Blog Project run by Laura Packard. Later that year, BlogPAC ran a contest to fund progressive entrepreneurs for infrastructure building. In 2009, BlogPAC funded the website software platform SoapBlox. BlogPAC was active until 2012.
