= Mixedink =

MixedInk was a startup that provided web-based, collaborative writing software enabling large groups of people to create text that expresses a collective opinion, such as a mission statement, editorial, political platform, open letter or product review.

MixedInk was first used publicly by a group of progressive online activists, the Netroots, to draft a political platform, a piece of which was subsequently included in the 2008 Democratic Party Platform. MixedInk formally launched in January 2009. The tool has been since been used to gather community input by media organizations, including The Associated Press and Slate Magazine, as well as political and government offices, including the White House Office of Science and Technology Policy. It has also been suggested that MixedInk's software would be useful in teaching writing skills, though the company does not highlight this application on its website.

MixedInk's platform attempted to combine elements of a wiki with a democratic rating system to ensure that the final text reflects participants' collective voice and cannot be hijacked by any individual editor. The collaborative authoring process occurred during a fixed time period in which contributors would write original, complete versions of the text; edit others' submissions; remix segments of different versions together to create new ones; and rate different submissions on a 5-star scale. At the end, the version of the text with the highest average rating was meant to reflect participants' shared viewpoint and was intended to be interpreted, published, or promoted accordingly.
