= OpenLeft =

American political blog

OpenLeft was a political blog active from July 9, 2007 until February 2011 by Matt Stoller, Chris Bowers (originally of MyDD) and Mike Lux, a former official in the White House under President Bill Clinton. Covering political and social issues from a progressive standpoint, it spearheaded a number of causes, including focusing attention and criticism on the Blue Dog Democrats and supporting net neutrality. The website's campaign garnered criticism from a number of Democrats, including Brian Baird.

On February 4, 2011 Bowers announced that Open Left would cease publishing new content, although previously published content would remain available. He explained, "As the people who founded the site, myself included, moved on to other projects, we have gradually run out of money to maintain operations."

== A Responsible Plan to End the War in Iraq ==
Stoller endorsed and helped create the document A Responsible Plan to End the War in Iraq, a policy plan designed for progressive/liberal Democratic congressional challengers (or incumbents) to endorse and point to as their "plan" for the Iraq War. The plan had several high-profile military endorsers, including retired General Paul Eaton.

== Collaborative legislation writing with Dick Durbin ==
In July 2007, Senator Dick Durbin (D-IL) visited OpenLeft to seek input into drafting broadband legislation in the Senate. The effort garnered notice for the coordination between senior lawmakers and bloggers.

== Public option campaign ==
Throughout the health care debate in 2009 and 2010, Chris Bowers worked with readers at OpenLeft to maintain a public whip count on the supporters of a health care public option. His whip count was an attempt to demonstrate that there were in fact 51 Senators who would support a health care reform bill through reconciliation that included a public option. Chris also engaged in a series of posts demonstrating that reconciliation was a viable means by which to pass a public option. Upon proving 51 Senators existed for such a goal, OpenLeft, in partnership with CREDO Action, bought ad space in traditional media sources such as The Washington Post, Slate, Roll Call and The Hill, funded by its readers. The ads were aimed at Majority Leader Reid and President Obama with the message of “no excuses”, pointing to the whip count, and asking Reid to put a public option in the merged Senate bill, which he later did.

== Net neutrality ==
Since its inception, OpenLeft has done significant work and reporting on the issue of net neutrality. OpenLeft's writers worked with Congressional and Senatorial candidates to encourage their campaigns to support net neutrality. Congressman and 2010 Senate candidate Joe Sestak wrote a piece on the site voicing his support of the issue. Former OpenLeft writer Matt Stoller played an instrumental role in gaining a commitment from every Democratic Senatorial candidate in 2008 in favor of net neutrality.

== Searching for John McCain ==
During the 2008 presidential campaign, Chris Bowers launched an initiative to influence search engine results for John McCain, and asked readers to do so as well. Readers raised the Google pageranking of links to certain articles on McCain's record so when voters searched for information on the candidate, those articles would be the first to come up. This effort helped voters become more familiar with McCain's negative history on issues such as Social Security, health care for children, and the Iraq war.

== Protect Maine Equality ==
In 2009, Adam Bink wrote heavily on the "No On 1" campaign to protect Maine's marriage equality law, discussing the importance of a win for the LGBT and broader progressive movement, and encouraging readers to contribute. Over the course of the election, his efforts helped raise nearly $1.4 million on ActBlue, included over $8,000 via OpenLeft's "Better Democrats" page on ActBlue.

In October, Adam Bink raised money from OpenLeft readers to travel to Maine and report from on the ground. While in Maine, he engaged on a number of issues to elevate attention to the election, including rank-and-file Catholics' response to the Bishop's involvement; the emerging role of new media infrastructure in supporting the campaign; and pushing back on opposition efforts. He also filmed and produced a thank-you video from the campaign to the netroots and organized several online blogosphere fundraisers. Adam also co-produced the 3-2-1 Countdown for Equality designed to help online activists understand the who, what, and where needed for the three LGBT-related elections in November 2009 (Washington State, Maine, and Kalamazoo, MI). When it was “swarmed” by nearly 50 other prominent blogs, it became the equivalent of tens of thousands of dollars in free media in the final days of the election.

== The Progressive Revolution ==
In January 2009, OpenLeft co-founder Mike Lux released a book titled The Progressive Revolution: How the Best in America Came to Be. In it, he discusses the history of conflicts between progressives and conservatives, disputes long-time conservative myths about progressive leaders and accomplishments, and details why the time is ripe for another “Big Change Moment.” The book was published by Wiley & Sons. After its release, Lux went on a 60-event, 29-city book tour to discuss the book and the future of the progressive movement. He also wrote a series of posts from the road on what the mood is out in the states among progressive activists.

== Movement-oriented campaigns ==
OpenLeft.com was known for being one of the few blogs on the internet to have built its own infrastructure, including its own email list, fundraising apparatus, and legislative contact tools for e-action. It is part of a left-leaning coalition of websites that pool their web space together to sell to advertisers. OpenLeft has used these resources to create several partnerships to interest progressive media and build broad action campaigns. Such partnerships include working with CREDO to create action campaigns on the public option, including buying ad space and creating petitions to Senate Majority Leader Harry Reid; Service Employees International Union (SEIU) on building a coalition for health care action, and with Friends of the Earth to provide on-the-ground coverage in December 2009 of the climate change conference in Copenhagen.

== List of notable regular contributors ==
- Chris Bowers
- Mike Lux
- David Sirota
