= Pseudanophthalmus holsingeri =

Conservation status
- Imperiled (NatureServe)

Scientific classification
- Domain: Eukaryota
- Kingdom: Animalia
- Phylum: Arthropoda
- Class: Insecta
- Order: Coleoptera
- Suborder: Adephaga
- Family: Carabidae
- Genus: Pseudanophthalmus
- Species: P. holsingeri

Binomial name
- Pseudanophthalmus holsingeri Barr, 1965

Species of beetle

Pseudanophthalmus holsingeri, or Holsinger's cave beetle, is a species of ground beetle in the family Carabidae. It is endemic to Virginia in the United States.
