= Scorigami =

Previously unrecorded final score

An NFL scorigami board as of September 13, 2026. The winning side's score is plotted left to right, the losing team's score top to bottom (ties correspond to the diagonal). Gray squares indicate scores that cannot occur, and green boxes indicate scores that have occurred at least once. White squares indicate scorelines that are possible but have never occurred and are therefore potential "scorigamis".

In sports, a scorigami (a portmanteau of score and origami) is a final score that has never happened before in a sport or league's history. The term was coined in a 2014 article by sportswriter Jon Bois for American football scores in the National Football League (NFL), and is primarily used in this context; it has also been applied sparingly across other sports leagues.

== Concept ==
In a 2014 article for SB Nation and subsequent 2016 YouTube video on their Secret Base channel, Jon Bois defined scorigami as "the act, and art, of producing a final score in a football game that has never happened before." In football, points can be scored by touchdowns (6), field goals (3), and safeties (2), with teams able to score 1 or 2 points on extra-point attempts after touchdowns. This uneven distribution, and their differing frequencies in play, means that some scorelines are more probable than others. Bois charted the history of scorelines in the NFL and noted gaps in the chart for various scorelines that have never occurred, dubbing these potential "scorigamis". As an example, the Seattle Seahawks' 43–8 win over the Denver Broncos in Super Bowl XLVIII was a scorigami, as no prior NFL game had ever finished 43–8. Two other Broncos Super Bowl losses, Super Bowl XXI (39–20 to the Giants) and Super Bowl XXIV (55–10 to the 49ers), are also examples of the concept.

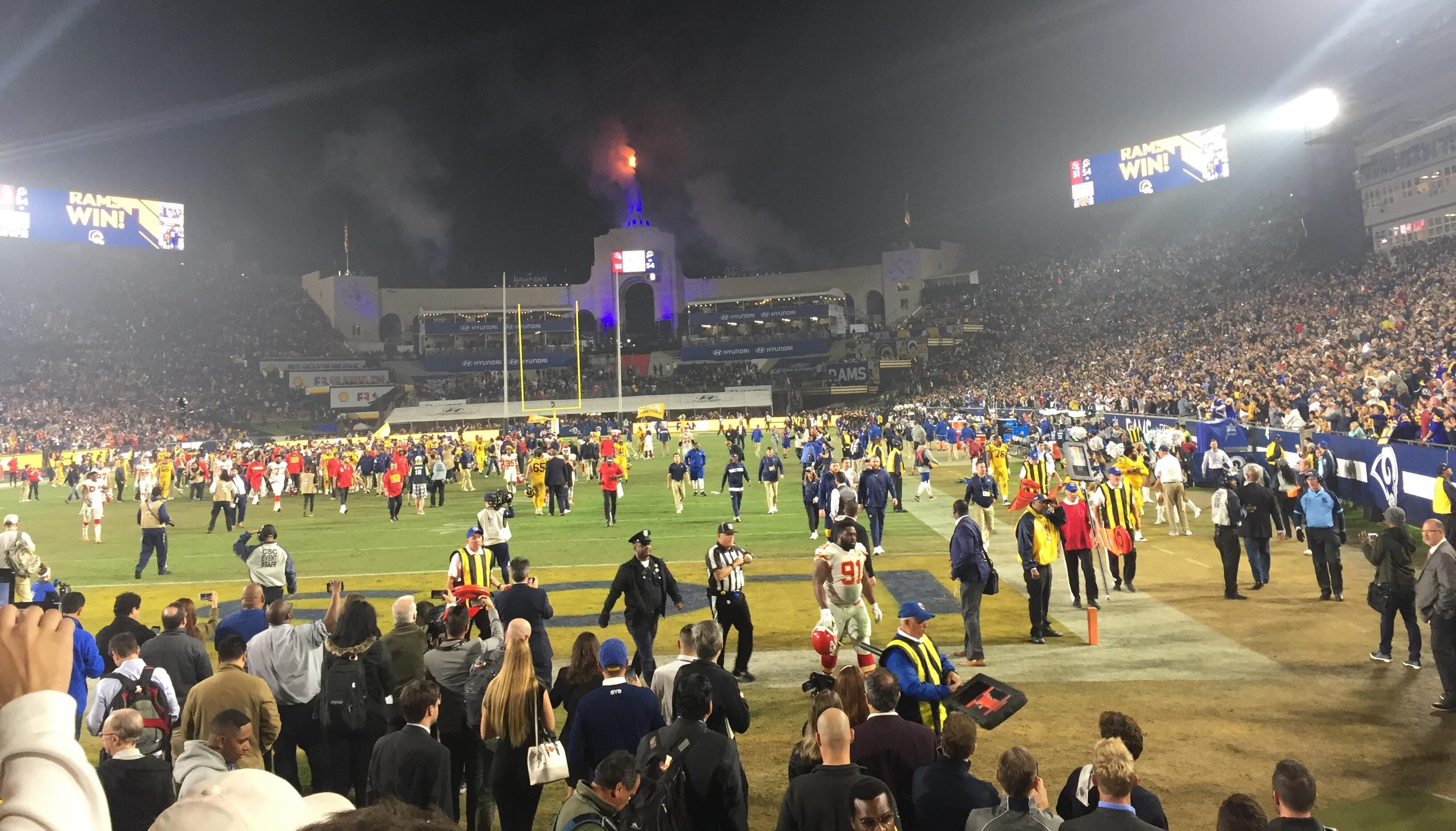
The Los Angeles Rams' 54–51 victory over the Kansas City Chiefs in 2018 was a scorigami.

Bois also notes in the 2016 video that American football is the largest sport in the U.S., and perhaps the world, where unique scores still regularly occur, as the vast majority of common sports will only allow points to be scored one at a time, such as soccer or hockey, or in much smaller multi-point increments, as in the case of basketball.

In 2025, Bois revisited Scorigami in a four-part series on Secret Base. Notably, he highlights a score of 10–1 as being one of, if not the most, unlikely NFL scorigamis that can be achieved. This score could only occur in the unlikely event of 1 point being scored by the defense after a touchdown (during the extra point attempt), as well as two safeties by the team that scored the touchdown.

== College football ==
Scorigami tracking is also done for American college football. Multiple issues affect scorigami tracking in the college game, including a much longer history, higher number of teams, disparity in team quality, and changes in scoring systems in the earliest decade of the sport, which means that the range of scorigamis is much broader, including a 222–0 football game and several 1870s and 1880s games in which the losing team scored one point, something that has never happened (and, for some score combinations, is mathematically impossible) in the NFL.

== Other sports ==
Scorigamis in other sports are occasionally noted.

=== Baseball ===
On September 9, 2020, Major League Baseball (MLB) had its first scorigami in 21 years, a 29–9 victory by the Atlanta Braves over the Miami Marlins—the previous scorigami for an MLB game had been a 24–12 win by the Cincinnati Reds over the Colorado Rockies on May 19, 1999.

=== Basketball ===
In September 2024, NBA Scorigami began being tracked on social media.

=== Association Football (Soccer) ===
The third-place match of the 2026 FIFA World Cup between England and France, won by England 6–4, was noted as a men's World Cup scorigami; as was England's 6–2 win over Iran in the 2022 tournament, reported as the first World Cup scorigami in 40 years.

=== Australian Rules Football ===
Scorigami tracking in Australian rules football has been applied to both the total scores of a game and the score report.

=== Cricket ===
In cricket, the concept has been applied to team innings totals in men's Test matches; for example, England’s 669 against India at Old Trafford in July 2025 was the first Test innings to finish on that total.

== Scorigami tracking ==
X accounts have existed to track scorigamis in the NFL. The most prominent is a bot operated by Don Mattingly, which tracked such statistics from the term's inception until 2025 and garnered over 500 thousand followers. An online checker maintained by MockSlate also allows users to enter any NFL final score to determine whether that score has previously occurred. Bois and other media observers noted the tendency of the Seattle Seahawks under former head coach Pete Carroll to create scorigamis; Bois dubbed Carroll "the wizard of modern Scorigami, without question". From 2010 to 2018, the Seahawks had exactly one scorigami per season and won all of them. Carroll himself has acknowledged his team's frequent scorigamis, joking to reporters after another game with a unique score, "That's ridiculous. I don't know how that happens. I'm thrilled that that happened again, for no reason. It's just something we've been working on in the offseason."
