= Netroots =

Term for political activism organized through blogs and other online media

Netroots is a term coined in 2002 by Jerome Armstrong to describe political activism organized through blogs and other online media, including wikis and social network services. The word is a portmanteau of Internet and grassroots, reflecting the technological innovations that set netroots techniques apart from other forms of political participation. In the United States, the term is used mainly in left-leaning circles.

The term necessarily overlaps with the related ideas of e-democracy, open politics, and participatory democracy—all of which are somewhat more specific, better defined, and more widely accepted. Netroots outreach is a campaign-oriented activity that uses the web for complementing more traditional campaign activities, such as collaborating with grassroots activism that involves get out the vote and organizing through interconnecting local and regional efforts, such as Meetup, and the netroots-grassroots coalition that propelled the election of Howard Dean to the DNC Chair in January 2005.

At times, the term "netroots" is used interchangeably with the term blogosphere, though the blogosphere is considered a subset of netroots in that the blogosphere describes just the online community of blogs, whereas netroots includes that plus a number of larger (mainly liberal) online outposts such as MoveOn, Media Matters for America and Think Progress.

Advocates claim that the essential quality of the netroots is its flatness and interlinked web connectiveness—that it constitutes communication points that reach out to influence traditional media but is not directed outward from any one point. Through events like a blogswarm, the netroots displays non-hierarchical and decentralized features.

== American origins of term ==
The first popular use of the term in its modern definition is Netroots for Howard Dean, by Jerome Armstrong in December 2002 on MyDD. Democratic political consultant Joe Trippi credits the short-lived success of his then-client Howard Dean to their listening and taking the lead from netroots activity.

The netroots also played a key role in drafting General Wesley Clark into the 2004 Presidential campaign. The growing power of the netroots was seen most recently during the 2006 midterm elections. In one such instance, a volunteer for the Senate campaign of Democrat James Webb of Virginia filmed remarks by then-Senator George Allen. The remarks in question, in which Senator Allen referred to the volunteer as a "macaca" (the volunteer was of South Asian ethnicity), were viewed by many as being racially insensitive. The video was posted on the popular video-sharing website YouTube. The resulting netroots attention to the video triggered a series of events that resulted in the defeat of the incumbent senator. James Webb had, in fact, been the subject of a successful netroots draft, which resulted in his entry into the Virginia Senate race. Netroots activists also supported Ned Lamont in his 2006 primary victory over Democratic Senator Joe Lieberman, wrote Ari Melber in The Nation magazine.

Blog writers have contributed to more than a few controversies and early netroots attention. Amongst these were the remarks made by then-Senate Minority Leader Trent Lott at a birthday celebration for then-Senator Strom Thurmond, the Dubai Ports controversy, the Mark Foley congressional page controversy, and the recent US Attorney controversy. In addition, the recent controversy regarding a Democratic presidential debate sponsored by Fox News, which the left-leaning netroots attempted to stop, ended with the debate being canceled.

In a December 2005 interview with Newsweek magazine, Markos Moulitsas Zúniga, founder of Daily Kos, described the netroots as "the crazy political junkies that hang out in blogs." He is also the co-author (with Jerome Armstrong) of the book Crashing the Gate: Netroots, Grassroots and the Rise of People-Powered Politics (ISBN 1-931498-99-7).

William Safire explained the term's origin in The New York Times Magazine on November 19, 2006:

... The Nation's Web site cited the unabashedly liberal Jerome Armstrong's praise of the Democratic Congressional Campaign Committee "for reading blogs and being ready to work with the netroots." From these citations and a few of the million and a half others in a Google search, the word netroots has a left-of-center connotation. The earliest use I can find is in a Jan. 15, 1993, message on an e-mail list of the Electronic Frontier Foundation from an "rmcdon[ell]" at the University of California at San Diego, apparently complaining about an internal shake-up: "Too bad there's no netroots organization that can demand more than keyboard accountability from those who claim to be acting on behalf of the 'greater good.'" ... Popularizer of the term—unaware of the obscure, earlier citation when he used it—was the aforementioned (great old word) Armstrong on his blog, MyDD, on Dec. 18, 2002, as he went to work on the presidential campaign of Gov. Howard Dean of Vermont.... headlined his entry "Netroots for Dean in 2004" and told Internet readers where to get the first inkling of a groundswell: "O.K., so Dean is still polling 1 to 4 percent nationally, so what. Look at the netroots."

== Similar activities elsewhere ==
So-called netroots activity also takes place in Iran, which has a disproportionately high number of bloggers, and in the United Kingdom, where there is strong support for e-democracy in the form of local issues forums have become an approved form of feedback on government performance. Netroots UK is a project started in 2011 in partnership with the US Netroots Nation organisers to strengthen the UK's netroots through training and networking. In Australia, the netroots "progressive" lobbying group GetUp has more members than all Australian political parties combined.

Netroots activity has also begun to spring up in student politics, where online social networking programs such as Facebook have been used in student elections.

In Sweden, the Social Democratic Party have initiated a network open to all "progressive" bloggers in Sweden. The network meets on a regular basis and holds a yearly gathering, Nätrot (Netroot in Swedish) Netroots.se. The first Nätrot gathering was held in the Swedish parliament 2006 with Joe Trippi as guest speaker. The second one was 2008 also in the Swedish parliament, and the third, Nätrot '09 was in Visby, Almedalen featuring John Aravosis from Americablog and Jane Hamsher from Firedoglake.

In 2010, the book "Netroots - a progressive blog movement that set the agenda" (Netroots - En progressiv bloggrörelse som sätter agendan) was published in Sweden (author Johan Ulvenlöv). The book explains various bloggers about how media content changed after blog entry and how they are partially set the agenda.

In 2012, the largest gathering of progressive bloggers in Scandinavia took place in Stockholm.

== See also ==
- Participatory journalism
- Political blog
- Open politics
- Netroots Nation
- MoveOn
