= Jonathan Singer (journalist) =

Jonathan Hershel Singer (born April 15, 1984, in Vancouver, British Columbia) is a progressive blogger. For five years, he was a writer for the progressive blog MyDD, which was credited by Campaigns and Elections magazine as being "the first major liberal blog".

Singer is perhaps best known for his various interviews with prominent politicians, first for his own site, "Basie!", and then later for MyDD. Singer was also co-host of the MyDD Blog Talk Radio show, featuring the Award-Winning Best F&%#ing Political Team on Internet Radio consisting of Singer, Adam Conner, and Aaron Banks. His interviews have included former Democratic and Republican presidential nominees, such as John Kerry, Walter Mondale, Bob Dole, Michael Dukakis, and George McGovern, as well as candidates for the 2008 Democratic Party presidential nomination: Barack Obama, John Edwards, Bill Richardson, Chris Dodd, Russ Feingold and Tom Vilsack. He has also interviewed current and former leaders like Senate Majority Leader Harry Reid, House Speaker Nancy Pelosi, and former House Speaker Tom Foley, and dozens of senatorial, congressional and gubernatorial candidates all around the country.

In his writing, Singer primarily covers all aspects of campaigns and elections, from polling and fund-raising to opposition research and insider rumors. He has been quoted or cited in this capacity by Newsweek, The New York Times, USA Today, Politico, The Chronicle of Higher Education and others.

He currently blogs at Polising.com.

He has also taken an active role supporting the confirmation of 9th Circuit Court of Appeals nominee Goodwin Liu, earning him the enmity of conservatives such as Ed Whelan.

Singer, who grew up in Portland, Oregon, graduated from Pomona College in Claremont, California in May 2006 with a degree in Politics and earned a law degree from Boalt Hall at the University of California, Berkeley in May 2010.
