= Eleven Jones Cave =

Cave in Louisville, Kentucky, USA

Coordinates: 38°13′19″N 85°43′27″W

Eleven Jones Cave is located by Beargrass Creek in Louisville, Kentucky. It is 1,600 feet (490 m) southeast of the corner of Eastern Parkway and Poplar Level Road on the west bank, between Louisville Cemetery and Calvary Cemetery, near St. Xavier High School. It is developed in Louisville Limestone 448 feet above sea level. A spring discharges water into Beargrass Creek.

The cave is the best known and most well documented in Jefferson County. It is popularly said to be named for being used by eleven brothers called Jones. However, some believe it was actually named from early residents Levin Powell and John Jones.

The stoopway entrance that is 4.5 feet (1.4 m) high and 2.5 feet (0.76 m) wide leads to a forty-foot passage into a fairly normal limestone crawlway conduit cave. It is the only known habitat for the Louisville cave beetle, which is listed as a candidate for endangered species status.

== The legend ==
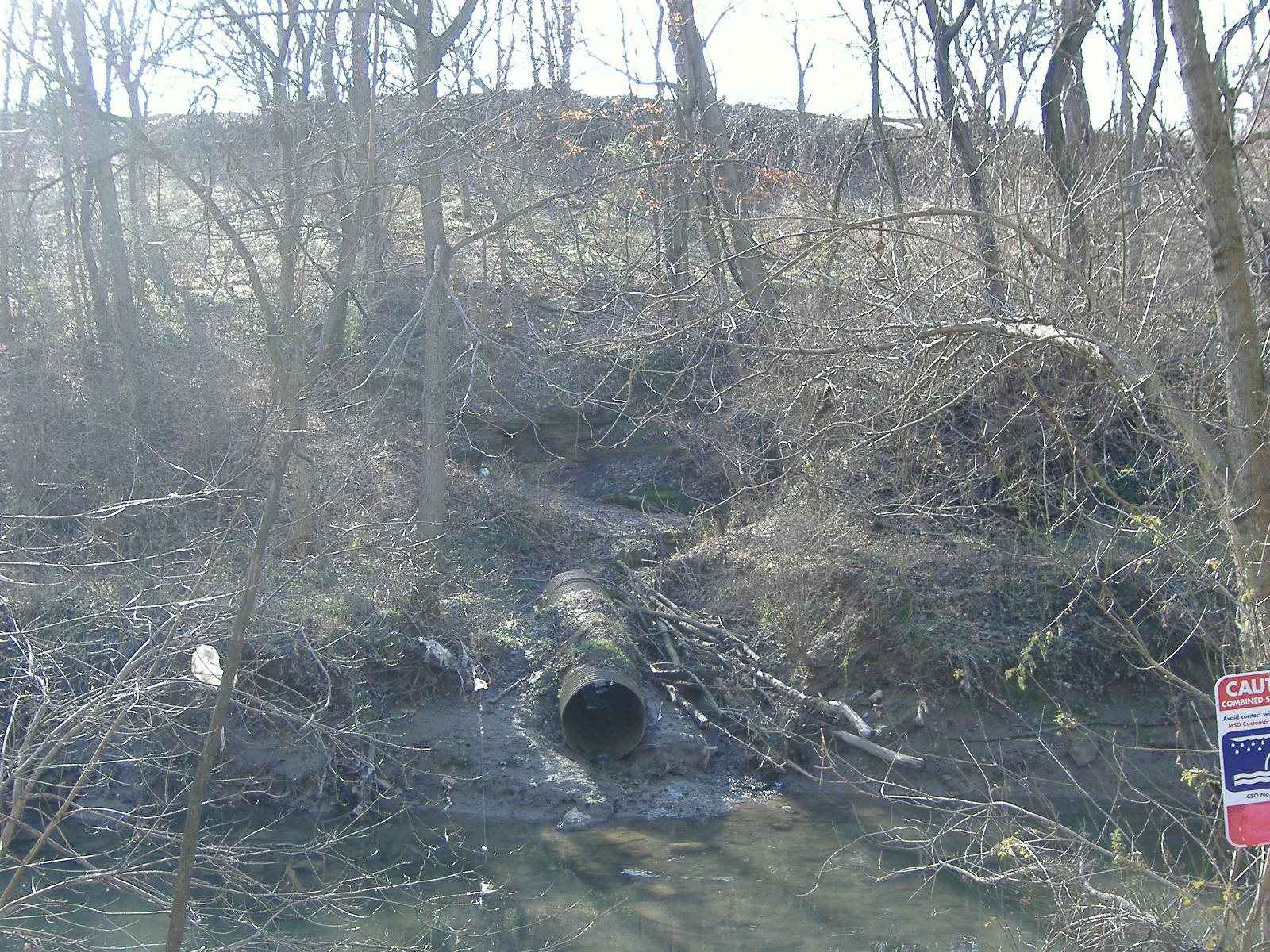
View from east bank

The Joneses were supposed to have used the cave as a hideout in the 19th century. They were reportedly bank robbers, counterfeiters, and murderers. They stashed their ill-gotten gains within the cave. The brothers also created eleven rooms to live in within the cave. The Joneses eventually left the area, and their treasure reportedly hid behind collapsed rocks. Since the rooms have never been found, legend often says the gang sealed them off by collapsing the cave roof. The cave was supposedly once large enough to drive a horse and carriage through, but has since "shrunk", a geological impossibility.

Three-inch bars on a gate were supposed to further decrease the chances that someone might find the Jones' gold, silver, and jewels. These bars were said to prevent access to a main passage, which was also supposed to be guarded by a cannon. A book published by University of Kentucky Press has called this account "mythical".

Early descriptions of the area, as late as 1822, make no mention of the cave or legends surrounding it, but it was known to locals as the source of a spring by 1831. It was first definitively called Eleven Jones Cave in 1848. Eight entrances were said to have been located along Beargrass Creek, although none apart from the main entrance were ever found.

== Studies ==
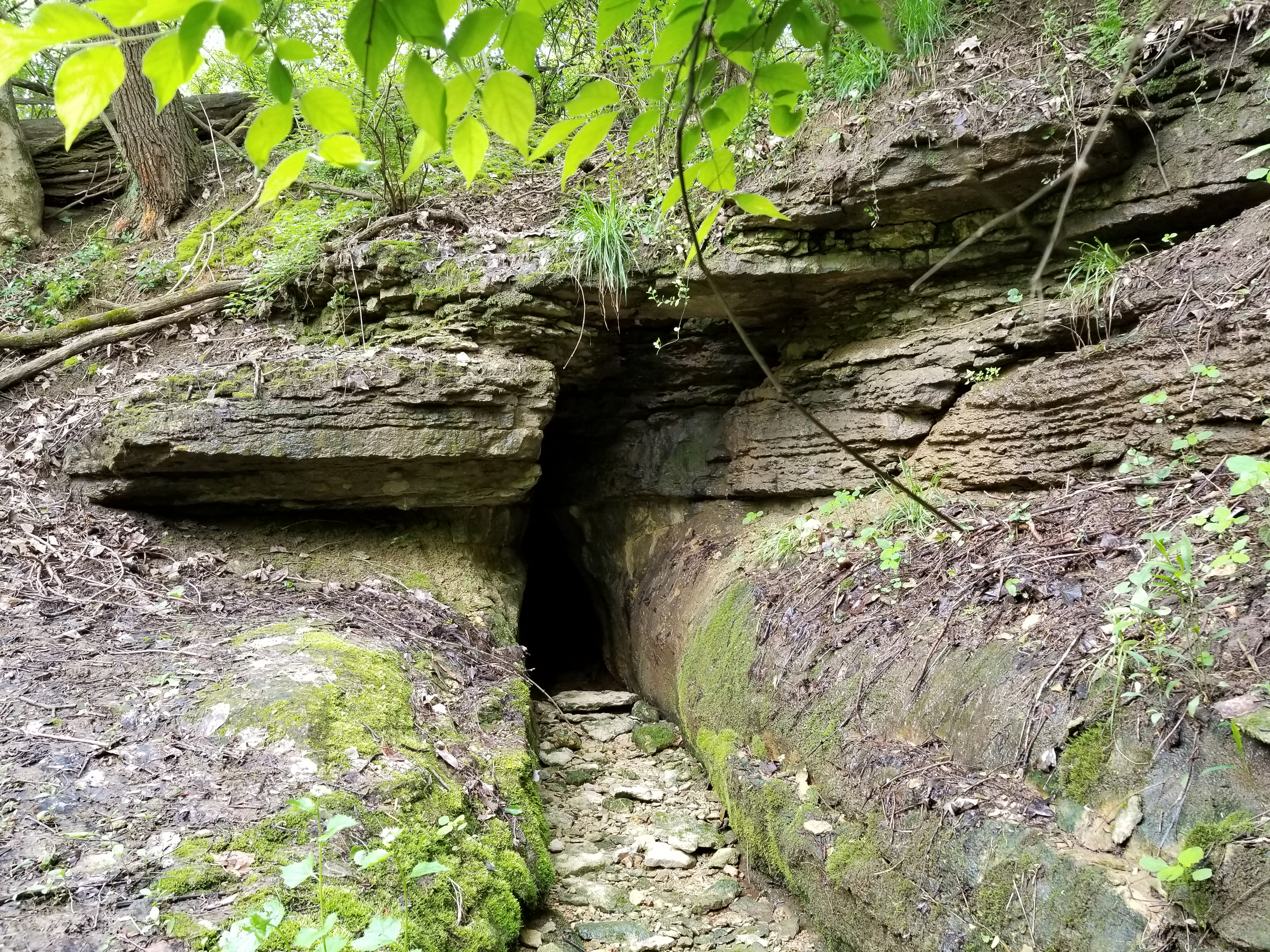
Eleven Jones Cave entrance

In 1967, there were two physical survey trips into the cave, but neither found evidence of the Jones Brothers' story, nor for a story that in 1949 an army saber from the American Civil War was discovered within the cave. All that was found was the cave had no entrance other than the reliable spring entrance on Beargrass Creek.

"Bad air" is present in the cave, with very high levels of carbon dioxide just inside the entrance. Dangerous hypoxia is possible within minutes, and fatal poisoning is likely further into the cave. Concentrations of CO_{2} inside the cave are in excess of 10 times the normal atmospheric value.

It is the only known location for living Louisville cave beetles, Pseudanophthalmus troglodytes. This insect is reddish-brown, small, eyeless, and eats invertebrates. The Louisville cave beetle was described in 1973 from specimens collected from Oxmoor Cave (near Oxmoor Center). During 1994, surveys of other caves that could potentially support the species were conducted and the species was found in only one additional cave, Eleven Jones Cave. Oxmoor Cave was bulldozed over in 1990. The species has been listed as "imperiled" by the Kentucky Natural Heritage Program. Since 1994, it has been a candidate for ESA protection, but currently has no state or federal protections.

== In popular media ==
Ed Krieger, a character in 17776, hides in Eleven Jones Cave, and breaks the fourth wall to warn the reader not to visit it due to the danger present there.

== See also ==
- List of caves in the United States
- List of critically endangered insects
- List of endangered species in North America
