= Pseudanophthalmus packardi =

Conservation status
- Critically Imperiled (NatureServe)

Scientific classification
- Domain: Eukaryota
- Kingdom: Animalia
- Phylum: Arthropoda
- Class: Insecta
- Order: Coleoptera
- Suborder: Adephaga
- Family: Carabidae
- Genus: Pseudanophthalmus
- Species: P. packardi

Binomial name
- Pseudanophthalmus packardi Barr, 1959

Species of beetle

Pseudanophthalmus packardi is a species of beetle found only in the Carter Caves of Kentucky. Individuals are blind and predatory, and remain close to underground streams in caves. They were first discovered in the X Cave in the late 1800s, but were mistaken for another species until Thomas C. Barr discovered its uniqueness in 1957.
