= Mike Lux =

American political activist (born 1960)

Mike Lux (born May 13, 1960, Lincoln, Nebraska) is the co-founder and president of Progressive Strategies, L.L.C., a political consulting firm founded in 1999, focused on strategic political consulting for non-profits, labor unions, PACs and progressive donors.

Previously, he was Senior Vice President for Political Action at People For the American Way (PFAW), and the PFAW Foundation, and served in the Clinton White House from January 1993 to mid-1995 as a Special Assistant to the President for Public Liaison. He also played a role in five different presidential campaign teams. In recent years, he co-founded the progressive blog OpenLeft.com and was named to the transition team for Barack Obama.

Lux serves on the boards of several progressive organizations, including the Arca Foundation. In addition to serving on the board, he was a co-founder of Americans United for Change, Center for Progressive Leadership, Grassroots Democrats, PoliticsTV, Progressive Majority, and Women's Voices Women Vote. He also played a role in helping launch the Center for American Progress and Air America.

== Early years ==
Lux was born and raised in Lincoln, Nebraska. He graduated from Lincoln Northeast High School and attended Oberlin College. Early in his career, he worked with the VISTA program with Southeast Nebraska Small Farms Action Group. He then went on to become the Executive Director of the Iowa Citizen Action Network. During the 1988 election cycle he served on the senior staff for the presidential campaigns of Joe Biden, and later, Paul Simon. He then co-founded The Strategy Group with David Wilhelm and was PAC director and chief lobbyist for the Iowa AFL-CIO.

== Career ==
=== Work for Bill Clinton ===
In 1992, Lux took a leave of absence from the AFL-CIO when hired to serve as National Constituencies Director on the 1992 Clinton/Gore campaign. After Clinton won the election, Lux served on the 1992 presidential transition team.

Clinton appointed Lux as Special Assistant to the President for Public Liaison. In this role, Lux was responsible for outreach to constituencies around the major 1993-94 health care reform battle. He organized several events such as the first national clergy breakfast, the first state opinion leader's days, and the first bill signing ceremony of the Clinton presidency. He served in the 1993 budget war room and the 1994 health care war room, and was the White House staffer who organized the coalition to fight school lunch cuts.

=== Organizations founded ===
In 1999, Lux co-founded Progressive Strategies L.L.C., a political consulting firm located in Washington, D.C.

In 2000, Lux founded American Family Voices, an organization that encourages grassroots involvement on middle-class issues. AFV and Lux have received media attention due to their ad campaigns. American news magazine National Review wrote that "American Family Voices has a talented leader, rich supporters, and some important friends in the press. That's more than enough to keep making trouble for George W. Bush."

In July 2007, Lux co-founded OpenLeft.com with bloggers Matt Stoller and Chris Bowers. OpenLeft is a news, analysis and action website dedicated toward building a progressive governing majority in America. It was also founded with the intent to bridge conversational gaps between party insiders and grassroots activists. The Nation wrote that the site allows for "substantive debate that would otherwise not occur.'

=== Campaign for Community Change ===
In August 2008, the Campaign for Community Change announced it was receiving a grant from Atlantic Philanthropies to hire Lux as a senior fellow.

=== 2008 Obama transition team ===
In November 2008, Lux was named to the Obama/Biden Transition team. In that role, he served as an adviser to the Public Liaison on relationships with the progressive community and gave strategic advice on structuring the Office of Public Liaison based on his past experience working on the Clinton/Gore Transition, as well as in the White House.

=== The Progressive Revolution ===
In January 2009, Lux released his first book, The Progressive Revolution: How the Best in America Came to Be, in which he deals with the history of major conflicts between progressives and conservatives in addition to disputing long-time conservative myths about progressive leaders and accomplishments.
