= Pseudanophthalmus tenuis =

Conservation status
- Apparently Secure (NatureServe)

Scientific classification
- Domain: Eukaryota
- Kingdom: Animalia
- Phylum: Arthropoda
- Class: Insecta
- Order: Coleoptera
- Suborder: Adephaga
- Family: Carabidae
- Genus: Pseudanophthalmus
- Species: P. tenuis

Binomial name
- Pseudanophthalmus tenuis (G. Horn, 1871)

Synonyms
- Pseudanophthalmus bloomi Krekeler, 1958

Species of beetle

Pseudanophthalmus tenuis is a species of ground beetle in the family Carabidae. It is endemic to Indiana in the United States.

== Subspecies ==
These five subspecies that formerly belonged to the species have now been elevated to a full species Pseudanophthalmus stricticollis. These were:

- P. t. blatchleyi Barr, 1960
- P. t. jeanneli Krekeler, 1958
- P. t. morrisoni Jeannel, 1931
- P. t. stricticollis Jeannel, 1931
