= 17776 =

Serialized speculative fiction multimedia narrative

- Title screen from the story's opening video
- Author: Jon Bois
- Website: What football will look like in the future
- Current status/schedule: Completed
- Launch date: July 5, 2017
- End date: July 15, 2017
- Publisher: SB Nation
- Genre: Speculative fiction

17776 (also known as What Football Will Look Like in the Future) is a serialized speculative fiction multimedia hypertext narrative by Jon Bois, published online through SB Nation. Set in the distant future in which all humans have become immortal and infertile, the series follows three sapient space probes that watch humanity play an evolved form of American football in which games can be played for millennia over distances of thousands of miles. The series debuted on July 5, 2017, and new chapters were published daily until the series concluded with its twenty-fifth chapter on July 15, 2017.

Bois began developing 17776 in 2016. Because the story incorporates text, animated GIFs, still images, and videos hosted on YouTube, new tools were developed to allow it to be hosted efficiently on the SB Nation website. The work explores themes of consciousness, hope, despair, the infinite, and why humans play sports. 17776 was well received by critics, who praised it for its innovative use of its medium and for the depth of emotion it evoked. In 2018, the story won a National Magazine Award for Digital Innovation and was longlisted for both the Hugo Awards for Best Novella and Best Graphic Story.

It is followed by a sequel series: 20020, released from September to October 2020. The sequel series follows a 111-team game of college football on fields spanning 130,000 miles (210,000 km) across the United States. Bois originally intended to follow up with a further series entitled 20021; however, it was postponed indefinitely. In May 2025, Bois announced that the series would be continued with a novel titled 50007: An American Football Odyssey.

== Premise ==
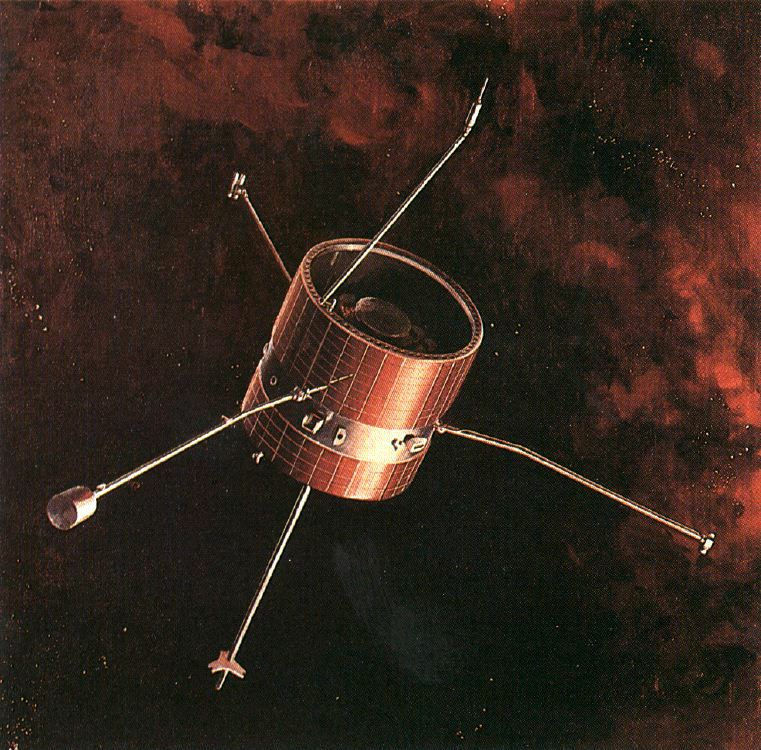
A newly sapient Pioneer 9 is one of the three main characters of 17776.

The story takes place on a far-future Earth where humans mysteriously stopped dying, aging, and being born on April 7, 2026. All social ills were subsequently eliminated, world peace was established, and microtechnology protecting humans from all injury was deployed unilaterally. In the United States, American football evolved to include new rules, including those that allow fields thousands of miles long, hundreds of in-game players, and games millennia long. Over time, some technology, particularly space probes, gained sentience due to constant exposure to broadcast human data.

By the year 17776, the space probe Pioneer 9 (referred to as Nine) has gained sentience and made contact with Pioneer 10 (referred to as Ten) and the Jupiter Icy Moons Explorer (referred to as Juice). As Nine adjusts to a world radically different from that of the 20th century, the three space probes watch multiple football games occurring across the United States: a game using the entirety of Nebraska as a field in which the next point scored wins the game; a game in which players strive to possess every existing football autographed by obscure NFL player Koy Detmer; a game played between the Canadian border and the Mexican border deadlocked for 13,000 years at the bottom of Horseshoe Bend, Arizona; an NFL regulation game between the Denver Broncos and the Pittsburgh Steelers that changed over 15,000 years into 58 playing teams owning and capitalizing upon portions of Sports Authority Field at Mile High while the ball is lost; a 500 game that results in the destruction of the Centennial Light; and a game in which the possessing player is attempting to score an automatic win by hiding in Eleven Jones Cave within his team's end zone for 10,000 years.

17776, the year in which the story takes place, was likely derived from 1776, the year in which the United States declared independence.

== Format ==
17776 is read by scrolling through web pages occupied by large GIF images and dialogue text color-coded to individual characters, interspersed with occasional YouTube videos. The story is divided into chapters, which were originally published in daily installments between July 5 and 15, 2017. Much of the GIF and video content of the series uses Google Earth satellite imagery, 3D buildings, and other tools within Google Earth to create animations and visual effects.

== Development ==
Bois wrote and illustrated 17776 for Vox Media's sports news website SB Nation, of which he was creative director. Aside from 17776, Bois produces two other recurring, humorous video essay programs for the site: Pretty Good, which focuses on unusual sports topics and stories, and Chart Party, which focuses on statistics and has an emphasis on Bois' use of visual art in his journalism and storytelling. Bois is also known for the Breaking Madden series, in which he attempted unusual scenarios in the Madden NFL series of video games.

In early 2016, Bois began developing an "anti-sci fi" project as a possible sequel to The Tim Tebow CFL Chronicles, an earlier work for SB Nation, and set the story in a year far enough in the future that "nobody ever thinks about it." Although he liked the concept and the visuals, he believed the project would not connect with readers and shelved it. Later, he realized that the story needed a centering character; he wrote one in the form of a small town, AM radio talk show host before coming up with the characters of the probes. Development renewed in May 2016, and the project solidified after SB Nation published its article "The Future of Football." Bois described it as the biggest project he ever attempted.

The series was developed by Graham MacAree, who used a Vox Media tool that creates custom packages from standard article sets to give Bois creative leeway and to accommodate the series' weight on the SB Nation website. MacAree found that there were few resources online for achieving the desired effects.

== Themes ==
Bois has stated that he had "conceived [17776] to give the reader a good time," asserting that this "was literally the whole point."

William Hughes writing for The A.V. Club described 17776 as concerned with why humans play sports: "That is, given the massive resources, time, and information at our disposal (not to mention those available to our descendants), why does communal game-playing still hold such an important place in society?" He also listed consciousness, hope, and despair as among the work's themes. Beth Elderkin of io9 described it as "a deep thought experiment into what we consider humanly possible". She also felt that Ten and Juice take on the role of angel and devil, and she suggested the two may be unreliable narrators. Ian Crouch of The New Yorker felt that the work had a "tonal echo" of Don DeLillo's 1972 novel End Zone due to thematic similarities "with the way that the order and logic of football might act as a counterbalance to the chaos of the real world".

== Reception ==
According to the communications director at Vox Media, 17776 garnered over 2.3 million pageviews by July 10. Two days later, it had received more than 2.9 million pageviews. Average engagement time was over nine minutes, and 43 percent of readers finished each installment of the series published by July 7. On July 19, Bois claimed that 17776 received 700,000 unique visitors and 4 million total pageviews, with an average engagement time of 11 minutes.

Thu-Huong Ha for Quartz described 17776 as "part Italo Calvino, part Peter Heller [author of The Dog Stars], with humor seemingly from within the depths of Reddit," saying that the story would appeal to fans of both sports and literature. Tor.com described the first chapter as full of tension and felt that receiving answers is a "surprisingly heartbreaking" experience "lessened by a gleeful bouncing immaturity" one would not expect from the characters. Beth Elderkin at io9 said the series is "akin to Homestuck" and described it as "weird, complex, and pretty spectacular". William Hughes writing for The A.V. Club felt that 17776 is a "truly innovative piece of work". After reading the first three chapters, Agatha French of the Los Angeles Times stated that she was "impressed and excited by the innovation" of what she saw, and that she was intrigued despite not knowing what the work is or is saying. She felt the work took full advantage of its online medium and suggested that it "may also be a glimpse into the future of reading on the Internet". Ian Crouch of The New Yorker described the series as, "despite its seemingly meagre parts, a thing of startling beauty". Of the chapters published by July 12, he felt "the most striking chapter" to be one that used audio of Verne Lundquist calling the end of a 2013 game between the University of Alabama and Auburn University over a video panning over Earth. He also noted that the series was compared to Homestuck and relayed additional comparisons to Thomas Pynchon novels and "a Reddit thread hijacked by robot trolls".

The series won the inaugural National Magazine Award for Digital Innovation from the American Society of Magazine Editors; this was the first National Magazine Award nomination and win for SB Nation. It was described by the judges as "an extraordinary combination of art, fiction and technology, an online acid trip that had to be experienced to be believed." It was also longlisted for the Hugo Awards for Best Novella and Best Graphic Story in 2018, ultimately finishing in 11th place in both categories.

== Sequels ==
=== 20020 and 20021 ===
On September 28, 2020, a sequel titled 20020 was launched on Secret Base, a branch of SB Nation. One chapter of 20020 was released every Monday, Wednesday, and Friday beginning on September 28, 2020, and ending on October 23.

It focuses on a similarly lengthy, interconnected, 111-team competition based on college football. The sentient space probes featured in 17776 return, with Juice serving as the game's designer and commissioner. 20020's format largely resembles 17776's with a more involved use of Google Earth–based YouTube video storytelling interspersed regularly into the narrative.

On October 13, 2020, it was revealed that 20020 was planned to serve as the first part of a two-part continuation of 17776, with the second half, 20021, set for release on Secret Base in the winter or spring of 2021, and 20020 itself ending on a cliffhanger. However, 20021 was later postponed indefinitely.

=== 50007 ===
In May 2025, Jon Bois announced a publishing deal with Tor for a novel titled 50007: An American Football Odyssey, set in the same continuity as 17776. In August 2026, Bois shared an image of a draft of the novel, which confirmed characters from the web series would return, including Juice and Ten.

== See also ==
- Hypertext fiction
- Electronic literature
