= Secret Base =

Sports YouTube channel

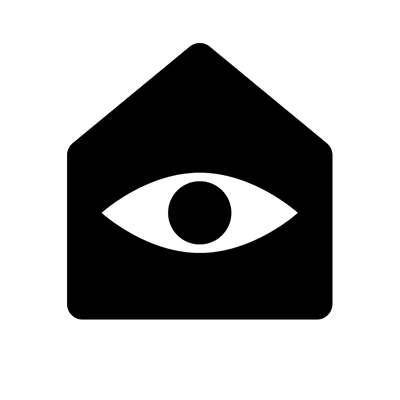
- Logo used since 2020

YouTube information
- Channel: Secret Base
- Years active: 2012–present
- Genre: Sports
- Subscribers: 1.51 million
- Views: 643 million
- Last updated: April 10, 2026

Secret Base is the YouTube channel of sports blogging network SB Nation. It hosts the publication's video content as well as series by executive producer Jon Bois, including Pretty Good, Dorktown, and 20020. It launched in 2012 and was rebranded as Secret Base in August 2020.

== History ==
On December 22, 2011, SB Nation published the first video to its YouTube channel. SB Nation officially launched the channel on March 1, 2012, although some SB Nation videos had been posted to the channel previously. The channel was created as a part of the YouTube Original Channel Initiative, providing funding to media organizations to post content on the platform.

A paid subscription on Patreon was launched in May 2024, coinciding with the revival of Pretty Good. The subscription offers supporters exclusive podcasts and early access to new videos.

On February 11, 2025, Vox Media laid off three employees who made up more than 20% of the staff at Secret Base. The layoffs included Steven Godfrey, who had been working at SB Nation since 2011, and Kofie Yeboah, who had been working at Secret Base since 2017.

== Content ==
Since 2020, Secret Base has published a variety of primarily sports-related video series, including series such as Dorktown, Pretty Good, and Beef History, among others.

=== Dorktown ===
Dorktown is a documentary series created by Jon Bois and Alex Rubenstein that focuses on obscure sports stories and histories. In 2023, Secret Base released a seven-part series called "The History of the Minnesota Vikings," focusing on the long and varied history of the Minnesota Vikings NFL franchise. Other multi-episode Dorktown documentaries include "The History of the Seattle Mariners" in 2020, "The History of the Atlanta Falcons" in 2021, "Captain Ahab: The Story of Dave Stieb" in 2022, and “SCORIGAMI” in 2025.

=== Pretty Good ===
Pretty Good is a documentary series created by Jon Bois that focuses on telling true stories of unusual events, and other miscellaneous topics. Some topics covered include the career path of baseball player Lonnie Smith, professional poker, the infamous 1904 Olympic marathon, the Lawnchair Larry flight and the TV series 24. The first 13 episodes of the series were originally published from May 2015 to September 2017, before going on indefinite hiatus. On April 24, 2024, 7 new episodes of Pretty Good were announced, and on May 1, REFORM! premiered on Secret Base's Patreon, covering the history of the Reform Party. Writing for In Review Online, Ryan Swen praised REFORM!'s political themes, which had not been explored in-depth in Bois' previous work, noting that "REFORM!, despite the magnitude of its issues and ramifications ... is maybe the most human of Bois' work so far."

== Reception ==
In 2020, The New York Times listed the first episode of "The History of the Seattle Mariners" as one of the best TV episodes of 2020. "The History of the Seattle Mariners" won the Best Documentary Feature award from the Seattle Film Critics Society in February 2021. In 2021, Secret Base won the Sports Series & Channels People's Voice Webby Award for Beef History.
