= Jerome Armstrong =

American political strategist (born 1964)

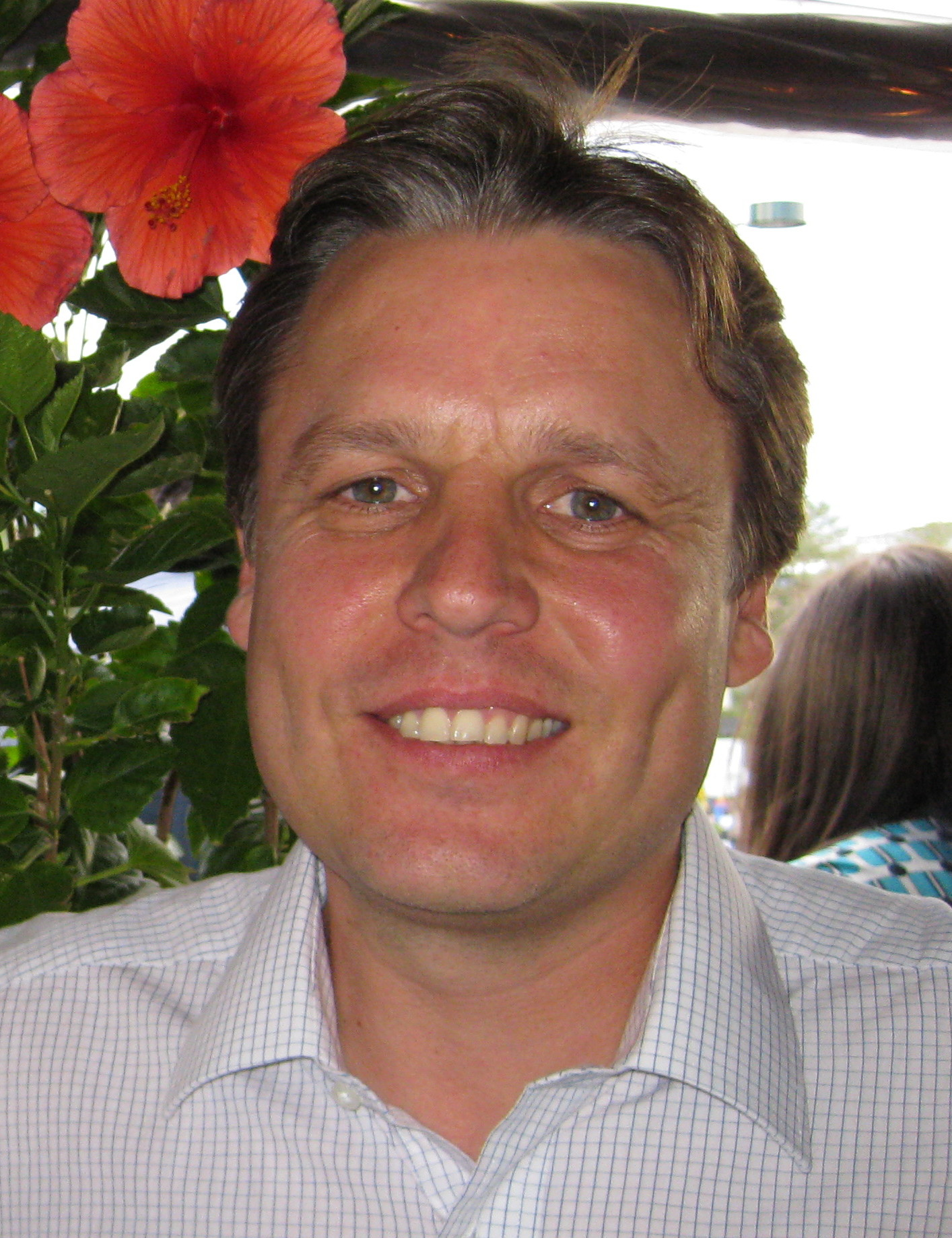
- Armstrong in 2008
- Born: 1964 (age 61–62)
- Other name: The Blogfather
- Education: Portland State University (MA); George Mason University (PhD)
- Occupation: Political strategist
- Known for: MyDD; Vox Media
- Notable work: Crashing the Gate

Jerome Armstrong (born 1964) is an American political strategist. In 2001, he founded MyDD, a blog which covered politics, making him one of the first political bloggers. Armstrong coined the term netroots, and was referred to as "The Blogfather" for having mentored many other famous bloggers such as Markos Moulitsas in their early years. He is credited as one of the architects of Howard Dean's 2004 grassroots presidential campaign, and bringing those tactics to campaigns globally. In 2005, Armstrong co-founded Vox Media with Markos Moulitsas and Tyler Bleszinski.

== Background ==
Armstrong was an environmental activist in the late 1980s, working with Greenpeace and Earth First! to curtail the logging of old growth forests in Oregon and end nuclear weapons testing in Nevada. During the 1990s, he served with the US Peace Corps in Costa Rica and worked with UNICEF in Sierra Leone, spent a year and a half at a Buddhist monastery, served in Americorps under the "I Have A Dream" program, and did community organizing in Portland, Oregon. Armstrong has graduate degrees in Conflict Resolution and Applied Linguistics.

== Online advocacy ==
In 2001, he founded MyDD, a blog which covered American politics, in which Armstrong's work was described by Salon as being "fiercely partisan but not radically left-wing." In 2004, Armstrong and Markos Moulitsas founded BlogPAC, a political action committee focused on progressive bloggers and politics online.

In late 2005, Campaigns and Elections credited MyDD with being "the first major liberal blog". In January 2006, the name was changed to "My Direct Democracy" as part of a site redesign, with a new tagline, "Direct Democracy for People-Powered Politics".

MyDD has been largely dormant since 2010. Armstrong explained that he "had to get out to save from becoming hardened, cynical, and without peace", citing the negativity in American politics.

== Political consultancy ==
In January 2003, Markos Moulitsas joined Armstrong in a political consulting partnership called Armstrong Zuniga, before being formally dissolved in December 2004. Howard Dean hired them for a time as technical consultants in 2003. Armstrong introduced the campaign to Meetup.com and directing on online advertising and blogger outreach. He worked with US Senate candidate Sherrod Brown's 2006 Senate campaign in Ohio. He also signed on with Mark Warner's Forward Together PAC to develop their internet strategy, before Warner decided to not run for president in 2008.

In 2007, Armstrong was awarded the Paul and Sheila Wellstone Award for Political Organizing by 21st Century Democrats, "for his visionary leadership in working to create the online netroots community". In 2008, London mayoral candidate Brian Paddick, a UK Liberal Democrat, brought aboard Armstrong "to help boost his campaign's online presence". By 2012, Armstrong had worked with over 40 campaigns through the political consultancy WebStrong Group for the US Democratic Party and campaigns abroad.

For the 2012 US presidential election, Armstrong went to work with the Libertarian Party presidential candidate Gary Johnson, and as a senior advisor with the Campaign for Primary Accountability, a Super PAC which supports challengers against US Congressional incumbents in the Republican and Democratic parties.

== Books ==
In 2006, Armstrong and Markos Moulitsas of Daily Kos co-authored the book Crashing the Gate: Grassroots, Netroots, and the Rise of People Powered Politics. The book takes a critical look at the state of the US Democratic Party, detailing the rise of a new movement that is reforming and taking over the party. An Australian edition was released in July 2006.

== Business ==
Armstrong, along with Markos Moulitsas and Tyler Bleszinski, founded the Washington, DC–based Vox Media, a network of blogs and online verticals, with funding led by Accel Partners.
