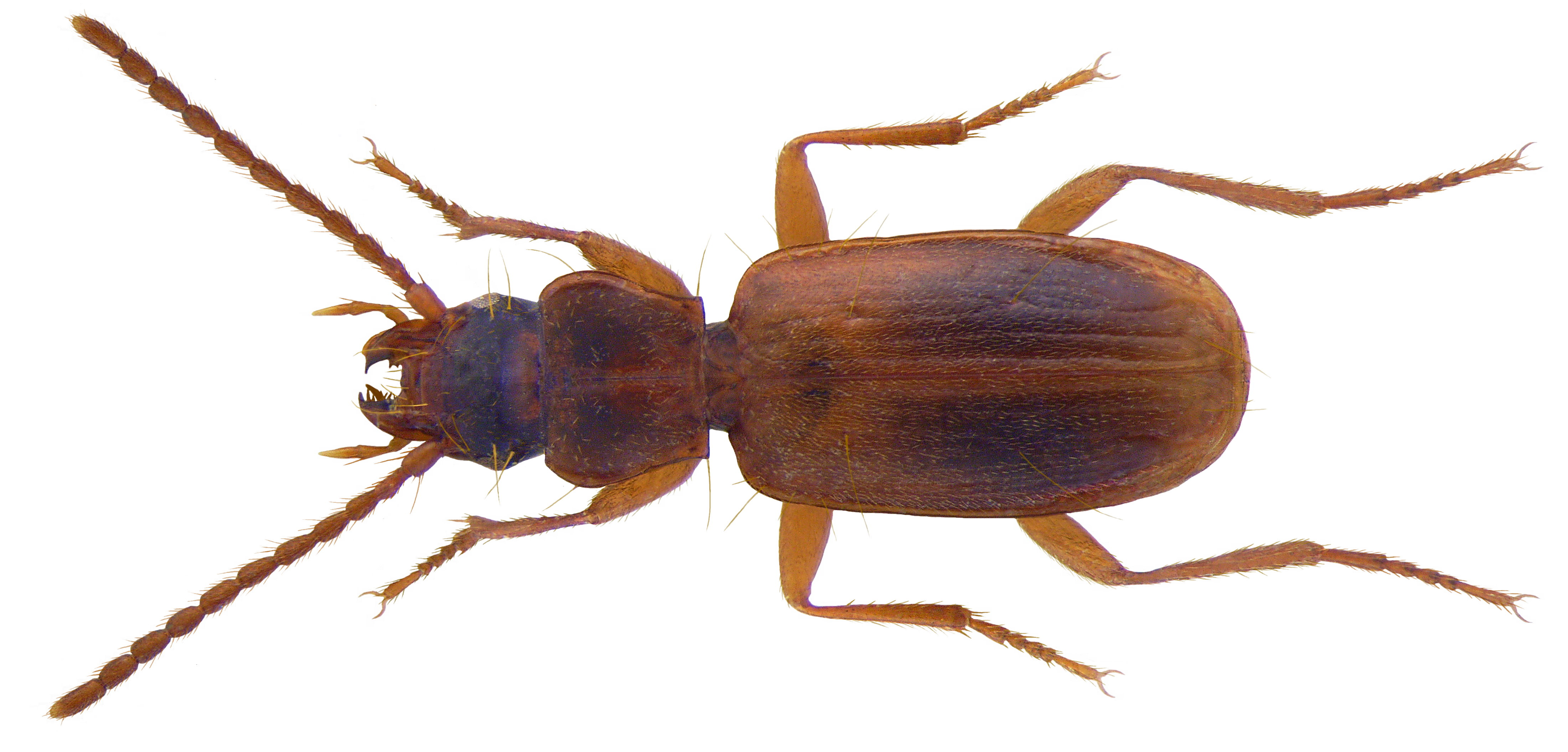

Scientific classification
- Kingdom: Animalia
- Phylum: Arthropoda
- Class: Insecta
- Order: Coleoptera
- Suborder: Adephaga
- Family: Carabidae
- Genus: Trechoblemus
- Species: T. micros

Binomial name
- Trechoblemus micros (Herbst, 1784)

Synonyms
- Carabus micros Herbst, 1784; Carabus planatus Duftschmid, 1812; Trechoblemus abdominalis (Motschulsky, 1844); Trechoblemus flavus (Sturm, 1825); Trechoblemus litoralis (Audinet-Serville, 1821); Trechoblemus pallidus Reitter, 1894; [Trechoblemus planatus (Duftschmid, 1812); Trechoblemus quadricollis (Putzeys, 1847); Trechoblemus sericeus (J.T.Fleischer, 1829); Trechus abdominalis Motschulsky, 1844; Trechus flavus Sturm, 1825; Trechus litoralis Audinet-Serville, 1821; Trechus micros (Herbst, 1784); Trechus quadricollis Putzeys, 1847; Trechus sericeus J.T.Fleischer, 1829

= Trechoblemus micros =

Species of beetle

Trechoblemus micros is a species of ground beetle in the Trechinae subfamily.

== Description ==
Beetle in length 4 mm. The upper body is reddish brown.
