= Pseudanophthalmus troglodytes =

Conservation status
- Critically Imperiled (NatureServe)

Scientific classification
- Kingdom: Animalia
- Phylum: Arthropoda
- Class: Insecta
- Order: Coleoptera
- Suborder: Adephaga
- Family: Carabidae
- Genus: Pseudanophthalmus
- Species: P. troglodytes

Binomial name
- Pseudanophthalmus troglodytes Krekeler, 1973

Species of beetle

Pseudanophthalmus troglodytes, also known as the Louisville cave beetle, is a species of ground beetle largely endemic to Eleven Jones Cave of Kentucky. It was described in 1973 from specimens from Highbaugh Cave.

== Conservation ==
Despite its limited range and Highbaugh Cave's entrance being sealed as a result of construction, field surveys from the Fish and Wildlife service determined the beetle lived in three more caves than previously recognized and did not meet the requirements to be listed under the Endangered Species Act.
