= Nelsonites =

Scientific classification
- Domain: Eukaryota
- Kingdom: Animalia
- Phylum: Arthropoda
- Class: Insecta
- Order: Coleoptera
- Suborder: Adephaga
- Family: Carabidae
- Subfamily: Trechinae
- Tribe: Trechini
- Subtribe: Trechina
- Genus: Nelsonites; Valentine, 1952

Synonyms
- Nelsonites Casale & Laneyrie, 1982

Genus of beetles

Nelsonites is a genus in the ground beetle family Carabidae. There are at least two described species in Nelsonites, found in the United States.

== Species ==
These two species belong to the genus Nelsonites:

- Nelsonites jonesei Valentine, 1952
- Nelsonites walteri Valentine, 1952
