= Jon Bois =

American sportswriter (born 1982)

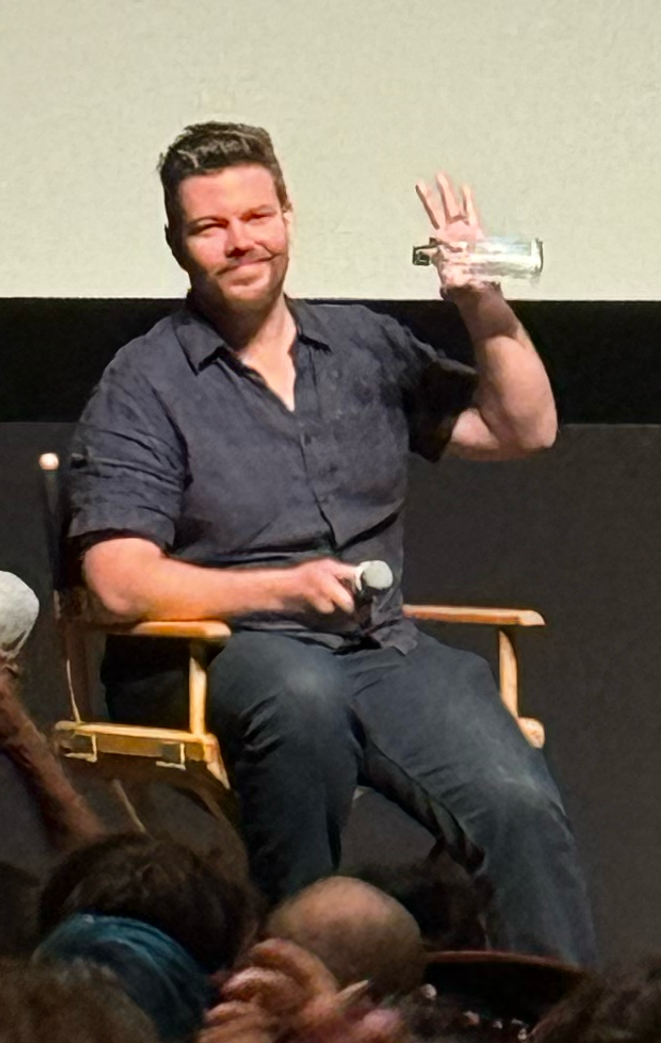
- Bois in 2025
- Born: September 24, 1982 (age 43); Kansas City, Kansas, U.S.
- Occupation: Writer
- Employer: SB Nation
- Notable work: 17776; The History of the Seattle Mariners; The Bob Emergency
- Website: sbnation.com/authors/jon-bois

Jon Bois (/bɔɪs/ BOYSS; born September 24, 1982) is an American sports writer, video producer, and YouTuber. He is an executive producer of Secret Base, the YouTube channel of sports blogging network SB Nation. Bois is known for his speculative fiction works on sports, such as 17776, its follow-up 20020, and The Tim Tebow CFL Chronicles. He is also known for his documentary videos and their unique style, often featuring a collage of many charts, pictures and other media related to the story and panoramic shots of the collection, a style that has been adopted by other YouTubers. Bois' work often covers strange incidents, statistical outliers, and teams considered unsuccessful or unpopular. He is the inventor of the concept of scorigami.

== Early life and education ==
Bois was born on September 24, 1982, in Kansas City, Kansas, and grew up in Louisville, Kentucky, until moving to Atlanta, Georgia, aged nine—in "places so ordinary that ghosts don't even live there," he once wrote.

From the fifth grade until high school, Bois was homeschooled. He graduated Waggener High School in Louisville in 2001. He dropped out of college after one semester. Bois worked at RadioShack sometime in the early to mid 2000s, later publishing multiple articles detailing his personal experiences as an employee.

== Career ==
Bois started blogging in 2003 on the political satire website ProgressiveBoink.com, which he co-founded along with a group of other writers, and first rose to online prominence co-writing the baseball-themed webcomic The Dugout with Brandon Stroud and Nick Dallamora. He started as an editor at SB Nation in 2009. From 2013 to 2015, Bois published "Breaking Madden," a series of articles in which he created unusual football scenarios in the Madden NFL video games. In August 2014, he published "The Tim Tebow CFL Chronicles," a sports story based on the fictional premise that NFL quarterback Tim Tebow had joined the Canadian Football League in 2021.

=== Pretty Good ===
In May 2015, Bois published the first episode of a YouTube documentary video series called Pretty Good. The series told true stories of unusual events, such as the career path of baseball player Lonnie Smith, an argument on Bodybuilding.com about days in a week, the 222-0 football game between Cumberland and Georgia Tech, Baron Davis's 89 foot field goal, the 258-141 basketball game between DeVry and Troy State (which he claims was actually 253-141 via scoring errors), professional poker, Dae-sung Koo's double on Randy Johnson, the Music City Miracle, the infamous 1904 Olympic marathon, the Lawnchair Larry flight and the TV series 24. The series has fourteen episodes, the last of which, about Randall Cunningham and the 1987 NFL Players Strike, was published in September 2017. One of these episodes, about Stanislav Petrov and the 1983 Soviet nuclear false alarm incident, has been deleted from Jon Bois' official YouTube channel. On April 24, 2024, 7 new episodes of Pretty Good were announced and posted on Secret Base's YouTube channel. These episodes have covered, among other things, the movie Independence Day, James Dolan and the New York Knicks, junk mail, the first transatlantic telegraph cable, and the history of people slipping on banana peels. As of June 29, 2026, Bois has not updated his YouTube channel since July 8, 2017, with his last video being an advertisement for his new hypertext, 17776.

=== Chart Party & scorigami ===
In 2016, Bois began another documentary video series called Chart Party, in which he used statistical analysis to explore and understand sports stories. Of particular note, Bois published an episode in December 2016 called "Every NFL Score Ever," in which he discussed how football's scoring system makes some final game scores very unlikely, and coined the term "scorigami" to describe the act of achieving a never-before-seen final result. The video led one viewer to create a website to track new scorigami instances, and the term has seen usage in other sports publications. The series has also discussed topics such as the saddest punt in the world (which Bois declared was a punt attempt by the 2006 Minnesota Vikings), how Barry Bonds’ 2004 season would have looked like if he had played without a bat, the NCAA Division I men's basketball tournament, NBA history prior to the usage of the three-pointer, and the career of Jeff Francoeur, who Bois describes as his “favorite worst baseball player”.

=== 17776 ===
In July 2017, Bois published a serialized multimedia narrative called 17776, a work of speculative fiction describing unusual forms of American football played in the distant future. According to Bois, the story garnered four million pageviews from 700,000 unique visitors in two weeks. The series won a National Magazine Award for Digital Innovation from the American Society of Magazine Editors. Bois began a sequel to 17776, entitled 20020, in September 2020. A sequel to 20020, called 20021, was planned to be released in Spring 2021, but has been delayed.

A chapter of Upon Further Review, a collection of sports what-if scenarios compiled by editor Mike Pesca published in 2018, was written by Bois, with his scenario being "What If Basketball Rims Were Smaller Than Basketballs?" about a fictional game between the Portland Trail Blazers and Los Angeles Lakers where the basketball rims were smaller than basketballs.

=== Dorktown ===
In April 2018, Bois and fellow SB Nation personality Alex Rubenstein began the series Dorktown, which followed a similar format and style as his prior series Pretty Good, showcasing unusual events, statistics, and personalities from sports history. In 2020, Bois and Rubenstein released a 6-part special mini-series of Dorktown chronicling the history of the Seattle Mariners baseball franchise. A "Supercut Edition" of the film, running 220 minutes in length, was released on YouTube on September 24, 2020. The film would go on to win the Best Documentary Feature award from the Seattle Film Critics Society in February 2021, with its first episode, "This is not an endorsement of arson," being listed by The New York Times as one of the best episodes of TV of 2020. He and Rubenstein released a similar documentary on the Atlanta Falcons American football franchise throughout August and September 2021. Between March and April 2022, he and Rubenstein released "Captain Ahab", a 4-part documentary on former MLB pitcher Dave Stieb. On June 26, 2022, he and Rubenstein released a documentary about the 1976 NFL Playoffs game between the Baltimore Colts and Pittsburgh Steelers, and the plane crash that happened after the game. Later that year, Dorktown released "The People You're Paying to Be in Shorts", a 147-minute documentary about the 2011–12 Charlotte Bobcats, the team with the worst record in NBA history, and the team's owner, six-time NBA champion Michael Jordan. In August and September 2023, Bois and Rubenstein released a 7-part documentary on the history of the NFL's Minnesota Vikings, similar to the prior series on the Mariners and Falcons. At over nine hours, it is Bois' longest work.

=== Fighting In the Age of Loneliness & other projects ===
In 2018, Bois collaborated with Felix Biederman of Chapo Trap House on the five-part documentary Fighting In the Age of Loneliness, presented in style influenced by British documentary filmmaker Adam Curtis, which focuses on the development of Mixed Martial Arts (MMA) from the early development of Brazilian Jiu-Jitsu and Vale Tudo in the development of more complex fighting styles. It focuses on the development of MMA as a mainstream sport, including Pride Fighting Championship and the development of Ultimate Fighting Championships, and their parallels to the 21st century neoliberal socio-political landscape of financial collapse and inequality. On December 29, 2020, a supercut edition of Fighting in the Age of Loneliness was released to YouTube to commemorate the Secret Base channel accumulating 1 million subscribers.

In 2019, Bois released a two-part series on professional athletes named Bob. Its title, "The Bob Emergency," refers to the dwindling numbers of such athletes, with Bois only tallying 10 active athletes named Bob at the series' end on May 21, 2019. Bois has previously written on this topic, referring to it as "The Bob Famine" in a 2012 article about Bob Sanders, believed to be the last Bob in major American sports.

On September 17, 2019, Bois and SB Nation video producer Kofie Yeboah started a video series called "Fumble Dimension". Similar to Bois' earlier "Breaking Madden", it consists of using in-game mechanics of sports video games to create unusual scenarios, usually with fan input from YouTube comments.

In 2024, Bois announced the creation of a new three-part series called "REFORM!" about the history of the Reform Party of the United States of America, with the first episode being released on May 1, 2024, and the final episode appearing on September 21, 2024. The episodes highlighted the careers of Ross Perot, Jesse Ventura, and Pat Buchanan and the rise and fall of the Reform Party.

On November 3, 2025, Bois announced that he is working on a series called The History of Charging the Mound. Players highlighted include Mike Sweeney, Bruce Kison, George Bell, and Lenny Randle, who Bois previously briefly touched on in "The History of the Seattle Mariners"; he also uses the Randle episode to touch on Ten-Cent Beer Night, a game in which Randle played.

== Style ==
Bois has a very distinctive audiovisual style, heavily utilizing Google Earth as a medium in which to place various visuals, making heavy use of newspaper articles, charts, and timelines to create a collage that builds over the runtime of a video.

His videos often make use of smooth jazz, from artists like Keith Mansfield and Alan Hawkshaw, as background music. Elaborating on his musical leanings, Bois says, "I have a love in particular for smooth, hyper-produced saxophone, from older stuff like Steely Dan and "The Captain of Her Heart" by Double, to newer stuff like Destroyer's "Kaputt," which I think is probably my favorite song."

Bois' work often centers on various sports statistics directly. He has been praised for making them accessible to a general audience in a way that makes them interesting and gripping, rather than background material. Bois has said that he is "making sports documentaries for people who don't watch sports."

Bois' work has been noted to cover less successful teams. Speaking to the "History of..." Dorktown series, Bois has said, "With the Mariners, the Falcons, and the Vikings, the obvious through line between the three is that none of them have ever won a chip, right? To an extent, that is part of the allure to us. We think the stories of teams that haven’t won it all are sometimes underappreciated or underreported."

== Personal life ==
Bois is a Kansas City Chiefs fan. He got married in June 2021, and became a father in October 2024.

== Bibliography ==
- 2014: The Tim Tebow CFL Chronicles
- 2015: "Lonnie Smith" (part of The Hall of Nearly Great)
- 2017: 17776
- 2018: "What If Basketball Rims Were Smaller Than Basketballs?" (part of Upon Further Review)
- 2018: "The Stallion" (part of SB Nation's Forest of Fright)
- 2020: 20020

== Filmography ==
=== Documentaries ===
Table featuring documentaries created by Jon Bois
Year	Title	Director	Producer	Writer	Narrator	Notes
2018	Fighting in the Age of Loneliness	Yes	Yes	No	No	Released in five parts. Written and narrated by Felix Biederman.
2019	The Bob Emergency	Yes	Yes	Yes	Yes	Released in two parts.
2020	The History of the Seattle Mariners	Yes	Yes	Yes	Yes	Released in six parts. Produced, written and narrated with Alex Rubenstein.
2021	The History of the Atlanta Falcons	Yes	No	Yes	Yes	Released in seven parts. Written and narrated with Alex Rubenstein. Produced by Rubenstein.
2022	Captain Ahab: The Story of Dave Stieb	Yes	No	Yes	Yes	Released in four parts. Written and narrated with Alex Rubenstein. Produced by Rubenstein.
2022	Section 1	Yes	No	Yes	Yes	Written and narrated with Alex Rubenstein. Produced by Rubenstein.
2022	The People You're Paying to Be in Shorts	Yes	No	Yes	Yes	Written and narrated with Alex Rubenstein, Seth Rosenthal and Kofie Yeboah. Produced by Rubenstein.
2023	The History of the Minnesota Vikings	Yes	No	Yes	Yes	Released in seven parts. Written and narrated with Alex Rubenstein. Produced by Rubenstein.
2024	Reform!	Yes	Yes	Yes	Yes	Released in three parts.
2025	Scorigami	Yes	No	Yes	Yes	Released in four parts. Narrated with Alex Rubenstein. Produced by Rubenstein.
2025	Fool Time	Yes	Yes	Yes	Yes	Released in four parts.
2026	The History of Charging the Mound	Yes	Yes	Yes	Yes	Ongoing, to be released in ten parts.

=== Video series ===
Table featuring documentaries created by Jon Bois
Year	Title	Notes
2015–present	Pretty Good	19 episodes
2015–2019	Chart Party	16 episodes
2018–present	Dorktown	38 episodes
2019–2023	Fumble Dimension	19 episodes
