= SB Nation =

American sports blogging website

- Screenshot SB Nation homepage
- Website type: Sports news
- Available in: English
- Owners: Sports Blogs Inc. (2003–2011); Vox Media Inc. (2011–2026); PMX Global, LLC (since 2026)
- Website: sbnation.com
- Commercial: Yes
- Registration: Optional (required for comments/posting)
- Launched: 2003; 23 years ago
- Current status: Active

SB Nation (full name SportsBlogs Nation) is an American sports blogging network founded in 2003. Its community sites cover individual sports or teams, including all Major League Baseball, National Basketball Association, and National Football League teams, as well as college teams, mixed martial arts, other sports and professional wrestling, totaling over 300 community sites at its peak. The coverage style of SB Nation's communities has an emphasis on the perspective of fans.

The sites are staffed by a combination of full-time employees and part-time contractors paid through monthly stipends or unpaid. These contributors cover game previews and recaps, analysis, breaking news, and more. Some have also produced regular podcast episodes. The sites encourage their readers to contribute to discussions on the sites. The network generates revenue through advertising.

SB Nation was co-founded by Tyler Blezinski, Markos Moulitsas, and Jerome Armstrong, and was headquartered in Washington, D.C. In 2011, the network expanded into technology content by launching The Verge, leading to the parent company Sports Blogs Inc. being rebranded as Vox Media. The network has also operated from the digital media company's offices in Manhattan. Vox Media's chief executive officer, Jim Bankoff, has served as SB Nation's CEO since 2009. In 2026, Penske Media Corporation, the largest shareholder of Vox Media, agreed to acquire a number of the company's brands, consolidating its existing publishing portfolio into a new subsidiary, PMX Global, LLC, comprising over 25 titles.

== History ==
=== Founding and growth ===
SB Nation was co-founded by friends Tyler Bleszinski and Markos Moulitsas in 2003. The single blog from which the network formed was launched by Bleszinski as Athletics Nation in July 2003, and covered only the Oakland Athletics baseball team. Athletics Nation quickly became Blogads's second largest website, following Daily Kos, where Moulitsas served as an editor. Following the blog network's creation, six additional writers were hired to join Bleszinski in creating content, and Daily Kos' platform was implemented to encourage online community growth. Established bloggers were selected to contribute articles, and sports fans could leave comments. After sites were created for all Major League Baseball (MLB), National Basketball Association (NBA), National Football League (NFL), and National Hockey League (NHL) franchises, along with some college and other teams, Bleszinski focused on company growth and making money.

In 2008, SB Nation raised $5 million in a Series A round of financing with Accel Partners, Allen & Company, and Ted Leonsis contributing. Jim Bankoff, who was advising the company during the venture round, became SB Nation's CEO in January 2009. The network had approximately 1 million unique users, 5 million unique users, and nearly 185 blogs by February. The NHL sanctioned and began linking to SB Nation content on its official website in April, when the network was averaging 5 million unique monthly visitors across nearly 200 sites. In July, Comcast's venture capital branch, Comcast Interactive Capital, spearheaded a nearly $8 million second round of financing. In September 2009, SB Nation was re-launched to serve as a nationally focused portal for the network's blogs. Revenue generated by the network increased by four times in 2009.

In 2010, the network launched 20 regional sites, bringing the total number of sites to nearly 275. SB Nation had 31 full-time employees and was receiving 40 million monthly page views by approximately 8 million unique users, as of mid 2010. Comcast SportsNet and SB Nation agreed to a content sharing partnership in shared markets in June 2010. In July 2010, SB Nation announced it had acquired The Sporting Blog from Sporting News and would merge it with its main website. In November, Khosla Ventures led a third round of funding for SB Nation, bringing the company's total funding to approximately $23 million.

SB Nation acquired the blog networks FanTake and The Offside in March 2011, expanding its coverage of college sports and soccer, respectively. One network, Hustle Belt, has run since at least 2014 to provide coverage of the Mid-American Conference.

=== Formation of Vox Media ===
SB Nation's parent company, SportsBlogs Inc., rebranded as Vox Media in October 2011, and hired several Engadget employees to launch The Verge, its first major expansion outside sports, the following month. In late 2011, MMAFighting.com was integrated into SB Nation after Vox Media acquired the mixed martial arts site from AOL. MMA Fighting produces The MMA Hour and The MMA Beat, which continue to stream on SB Nation and social media outlets, as of 2017.

In September 2012, SB Nation introduced a major redesign codenamed "SB United", which introduced a new "magazine-style" layout with a larger focus on long-form content and digital media, and redesigned logos for each of the network's approximately 300 blogs. The redesign was overseen by Spencer Hall, the site's first editorial director.

The LGBT sports website Outsports was acquired by Vox Media and integrated into SB Nation in March 2013. The site's founders retained editorial control, and the purchase marked the first time a major sports media company acquired an LGBT-focused website. SB Nation was averaging approximately 50 million unique visitors by mid 2013, and had approximately 800 contributing bloggers by the end of the year. Bleszinski left the company at the end of 2015.

=== Holtzclaw controversy ===
In February 2016, the site published a lengthy profile of Daniel Holtzclaw, a former police officer convicted of multiple accounts of rape and other charges, focusing on his college football career. The piece was seen as overly sympathetic to Holtzclaw while largely ignoring his crimes and his victims. It was taken down within hours of publication amid severe criticism. SB Nation editorial director Spencer Hall apologized for "a complete breakdown" of SB Nation's editorial process, and described the story and its publication as a "complete failure" of site standards. SB Nation subsequently cut ties with the story's author, freelance journalist Jeff Arnold, and put its longform program on hiatus pending a peer review of the editorial process that led to the Holtzclaw piece being published. The head of the longform program, veteran sportswriter Glenn Stout, was suspended and later fired.

In May 2016, Vox Media published the results of the peer review. It found that the longform program was isolated from the rest of SB Nation in a way that made it impossible for stories to be properly vetted. It also harshly criticized SB Nation for not giving individual editors the authority to review stories about sensitive topics. At the time, sensitive stories were reviewed by the newsroom's two most senior women, senior editor Elena Bergeron and senior content producer Sarah Kogod. The reviewers found that this practice made it appear that an individual editor did not have the responsibility to "care to the fullest extent about matters of ethics, integrity, and accuracy." It also raised concerns about the lack of diversity in the newsroom. Based on the review, SB Nation permanently shelved the longform program, replacing it with a features program. SB Nation also announced it would take steps to diversify its newsroom. In a statement, SB Nation said that the Holtzclaw situation revealed that "an organization cannot afford to wait to be diverse, particularly if that organization is one that wants to tell stories."

=== Partnership with the Ringer ===
In May 2017, the sports and culture website The Ringer transferred its publishing platform from Medium to Vox Media's Chorus platform. The site's founder, Bill Simmons, retained ownership and editorial control. The Ringer's parent company, Bill Simmons Media Group, and Vox Media agreed to share revenue generated by advertisements sold by Vox Media. Vox Media began sharing audience traffic between SB Nation and The Ringer. In August, the site underwent a revamp to match other SB Nation websites.

The Ringer, and its podcast network, were purchased by Spotify in 2020.

=== Accusations of exploitation ===
In the wake of the Holtzclaw controversy, Elena Bergeron was named SB Nation's first editor-in-chief in March 2017. In August, Deadspin published a report detailing SB Nation's reliance on underpaid and unpaid labor from site managers and contributors. Bergeron was quoted in the story, stating that it was "company policy that everybody who contributes for a Vox Media property gets paid." Several site managers who were interviewed for the same story were not aware of this policy.

In September 2017, a former site manager filed a collective action lawsuit against Vox Media contending that they were a misclassified employee. Three separate lawsuits were eventually condensed into one. The company ultimately agreed to pay $4 million to 450 writers and site managers to settle the case in August 2020.

Nine months after the initial Deadspin report, SB Nation had hired additional staff to provide greater support to team sites, increased the budgets for some sites, converted several part-time employees to full-time status, and added greater restrictions on the use of unpaid contributors.

In November 2017, Vox Media staff announced it was forming a labor union in association with Writers Guild of America, East. Though full-time SB Nation staff members were included, part-time bloggers and site managers were not. Vox Media Union ratified its first contract in June 2019.

=== Layoffs and site closures ===
In February 2018, Vox Media laid off 50 employees, including some members of the SB Nation social video team. A number of part-time copy editors and news writers were also cut.

In February 2019, it was announced that Bergeron would step down from her role as editor-in-chief, remaining until a replacement was hired. In July, Vox announced it would hire a senior vice president to oversee SB Nation. It wasn't until 16 months later, in October 2020, that the company finally promoted Jermaine Spradley to SVP.

In August 2019, after closing its national college football blog Every Day Should Be Saturday (which joined the platform in 2010 after originally being established in 2005 as an independent website), SB Nation announced a new college football vertical known as Banner Society, which will aim to " keep expanding, warping, and sharpening the conversation around college football in all its bizarre, corrupt, colorful elements", and "find new and different ways to connect with our audience directly, all over the internet". In September, SB Nation launched DK Network, a dedicated sports gambling website in conjunction with DraftKings.

In December 2019, Vox Media announced that in order to comply with California Assembly Bill 5, SB Nation would "end our contracts with most contractors at California brands" over the coming months, and transfer their roles to a new group of employees. The company stated that this would be an extension of investments that have seen more full-time employees working for the network's largest sites, and that former contractors would be able to contribute as unpaid "community insiders".

On April 17, 2020, in response to the COVID-19 pandemic, Vox Media announced it would furlough 9% of its workforce starting May 1, 2020, including SB Nation. By June, a number of writers and editors from Banner Society left the company through buyouts. In July, the company laid off 6% of the company, including many of those who had already been furloughed. An internal memo mentioned that Vox was only bringing back 30% of its furloughed workers. In September 2022, the company shut down a number of sites focused on college sports.

In January 2023, Vox announced another round of layoffs, affecting 7% of its staff. The cuts hit SB Nation hard, with a majority of the company's hockey and soccer sites becoming unaffiliated or being shut down completely. Women's ice hockey site The Ice Garden became an independent site with more financial backing than SB Nation had been providing. MMA site Bloody Elbow was sold to its original founder in March. In April, Sacramento Kings site Sactown Royalty was sold off to its original founder and Chicago Bulls site BlogABull moved to Substack in April. By August, Sounder at Heart, one of only two soccer sites to remain, left SB Nation and transitioned to a reader-supported model.

Despite these cuts, SB Nation also expanded. It launched a new golf website in May and its first paid newsletters, focusing on the Detroit Lions and Kansas City Chiefs in August.

Spradley, who had been serving as publisher since March 2022, left the company in January 2024. In March, Vox Media divested Outsports to LGBT-oriented publisher Q Digital, with the site's co-founders receiving an equity stake in the company. In April 2024, Vox Media shut down the website's podcast network.

On February 11, 2025, Vox Media announced they were laying off three employees from Secret Base.

In May 2026, James Murdoch's Lupa Systems purchased half of Vox Media, with Penske Media Corporation purchasing the remaining half the following month. SB Nation was part of this second half, and was organized with PMC's other media assets under a new subdivision named PMX Global, LLC. With the Vox name being retained by Lupa System's half of the Vox Media corporation, the acquisitions marked the end of SB Nation's relationship with the brand it had launched 15 years prior.

== Multimedia content ==
In May 2016, SB Nation created an online video series for NBC Sports around NBC Sunday Night Football. The network expanded into radio programming in mid-2016 through a partnership with Gow Media. SB Nation sold its first original television program, Foul Play, to Verizon Communications' go90, in September. The network was averaging approximately 70 million unique monthly visitors at this time. Foul Play premiered in May 2018.

In July 2017, SB Nation published 17776, a serialized speculative fiction multimedia narrative by Jon Bois. A sequel, called 20020, was published in 2020.

In January 2018, SB Nation and Eater aired an online three-episode celebrity cooking competition series sponsored by PepsiCo. The show featured National Football League players Greg Jennings, Rashad Jennings, and Nick Mangold as competitors, as well as chefs Anne Burrell and Josh Capon.

In 2018, SB Nation launched its podcast network, beginning with its NFL team sites and expanding to cover every major sports team. In October, SB Nation launched its first storytelling podcast, “It Seemed Smart,” a six-part series hosted by Spencer Hall.

=== Secret Base ===
SB Nation also maintains a YouTube channel which publishes regular web series, including Dorktown and Pretty Good, among others. The channel launched in March 2012, and in August 2020, was renamed to Secret Base.

In May 2024, the company launched Top Secret Base, a paid subscription on Patreon.

On February 11, 2025, Vox Media laid off three employees, who made up more than 20% of the staff at Secret Base. The layoffs included Steven Godfrey, who had been working at SB Nation since 2011, and Kofie Yeboah, who had been working at Secret Base since 2017.

== Recognition ==
In 2011, Time included SB Nation in their list of "50 Websites That Make the Web Great". SB Nation was a finalist in the seventh annual Shorty Awards' "fansite" category (2015), and received a National Magazine Award (or Ellie Award) in the "Digital Innovation" category in 2018 as the publisher of Jon Bois' narrative, 17776. After 20020 was released in September–October 2020, a third edition, 20021, was set to be released in 2021, but no release date has been set.

Letterboxd named Jon Bois' and Alex Rubenstein's collaborative documentary on the history of the Seattle Mariners the highest rated documentary miniseries of 2020, and The New York Times listed its first episode, "This is not an endorsement of arson", as one of the best episodes of TV of 2020. In 2021, Secret Base won a 2021 Webby Award for its Beef History series.
