= Neaphaenops =

Scientific classification
- Kingdom: Animalia
- Phylum: Arthropoda
- Class: Insecta
- Order: Coleoptera
- Suborder: Adephaga
- Family: Carabidae
- Tribe: Trechini
- Subtribe: Trechina
- Genus: Neaphaenops; Jeannel, 1920
- Species: N. tellkampfii

Binomial name
- Neaphaenops tellkampfii (Erichson, 1844)

Synonyms
- Anophthalmus LeConte, 1861-1862

Genus of beetles

Neaphaenops is a genus in the ground beetle family Carabidae. This genus has a single species, Neaphaenops tellkampfii. It is found in the United States.
