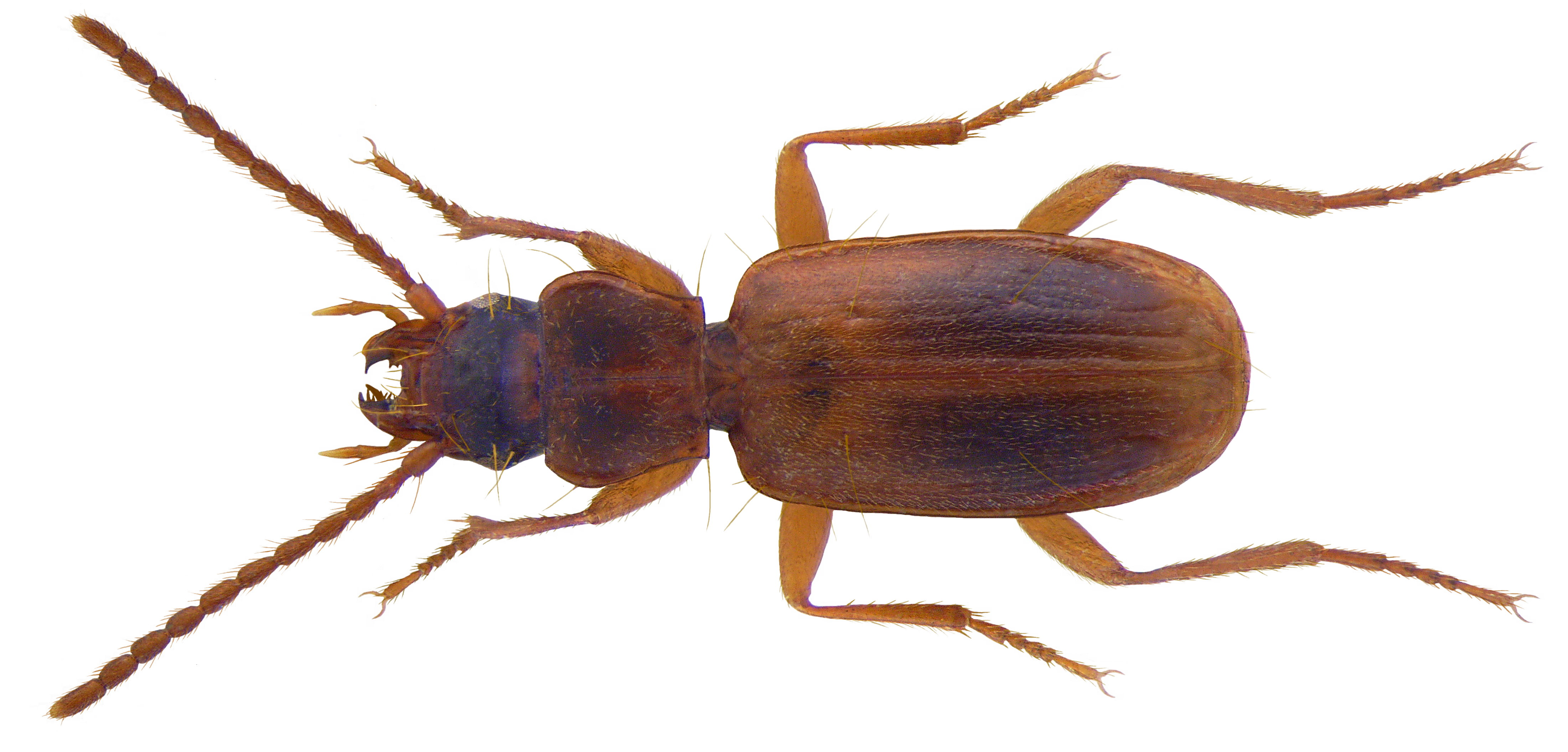
- Trechoblemus micros

Scientific classification
- Domain: Eukaryota
- Kingdom: Animalia
- Phylum: Arthropoda
- Class: Insecta
- Order: Coleoptera
- Suborder: Adephaga
- Family: Carabidae
- Tribe: Trechini
- Subtribe: Trechina
- Genus: Trechoblemus; Ganglbauer, 1891

= Trechoblemus =

Genus of beetles

Trechoblemus is a genus in the ground beetle family Carabidae.

containing the following species:

- Trechoblemus lindrothi Suenson, 1957 (China)
- Trechoblemus microphthalmus Ueno, 1955 (Japan)
- Trechoblemus micros (Herbst, 1784) (Palearctic)
- Trechoblemus postilenatus (Bates, 1873) (North Korea, South Korea, Japan, and Russia)
- Trechoblemus valentinei Suenson, 1957 (China)
- Trechoblemus westcotti Barr, 1972 (United States)
