= Markos Moulitsas =

American blogger (born 1971)

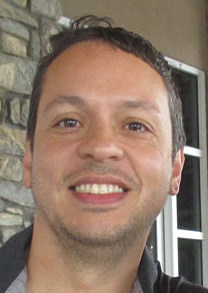
- Moulitsas in 2015
- Born: Markos Moulitsas Zúniga; September 11, 1971 (age 54); Chicago, Illinois, U.S.
- Other name: Kos
- Education: Northern Illinois University (BS); Boston University (JD)
- Occupations: Columnist, author, blogger
- Known for: Political activism, blogging
- Political party: Democratic
- Military career
- Allegiance: United States
- Branch: United States Army
- Service years: 1989–1992

Markos Moulitsas Zúniga (/ˈmɑːrkoʊs muːˈliːtsəs/; born September 11, 1971), often known by his username and former military nickname "Kos" (/ˈkoʊz/ KOHZ), is an American blogger who is the founder and publisher of Daily Kos, a blog focusing on liberal and Democratic Party politics in the United States. He co-founded SB Nation, a collection of sports blogs, which is now a part of Vox Media.

== Early life and education ==
Moulitsas was born in Chicago to a Salvadoran mother and a Greek father. He moved with his family to El Salvador in 1976, but later returned to the Chicago area in 1980 after his family fled when threats were placed on their lives by communist insurgents during the Salvadoran Civil War. As an adult, he has recounted his memories of the civil war, including an incident that occurred when he was 8 years old, in which he saw communist guerrillas murdering students who had been accused of collaborating with the government.

After graduating from Schaumburg High School in Schaumburg, Illinois, he served in the U.S. Army from 1989 through 1992. He completed training at Fort Sill, Oklahoma, and fulfilled his three-year enlistment as a Multiple Launch Rocket System (MLRS) Fire Direction Specialist while stationed in Bamberg, Bavaria, Germany.

By his own account, he "missed deploying to the Gulf War by a hair." Moulitsas has described the Army as "perhaps the ideal society – we worked hard but the Army took care of us in return."

Prior to enlisting in the Army, Moulitsas was a member of the Republican Party. During the 1988 presidential election, he served as a Republican precinct captain and assisted with the re-election campaign of Illinois Congressman Henry Hyde. However, during his time in the military Moulitsas began a transition in his political philosophy that would lead him to change his party affiliation from the Republican Party to the Democratic Party.

After leaving the army, he attended Northern Illinois University (NIU) and graduated in 1996 with two bachelor's degrees, majoring in philosophy, journalism, and political science. While attending, he wrote for the college newspaper, the Northern Star. Further illustrating the transition of his political philosophy, now a staunch supporter of gay rights, in 1993 while a freshman at NIU, he penned an opinion piece for the Northern Star denouncing efforts being made to lift the ban on homosexuals serving in the military. As a writer, he also questioned NIU's policy of spending student fee money on athletic programs, generating a negative response from school officials, and waged an unsuccessful campaign to save the school's journalism program. In 2007, he was inducted into the Northern Star Hall of Fame, an honor bestowed by the newspaper's alumni association.

Moulitsas attended the Boston University School of Law from 1996 to 1999, earning a J.D. degree. He then moved to the San Francisco Bay Area where he worked as a project manager at a web development shop.

== Personal life ==
Moulitsas describes himself as a recovering Catholic, and says that while he has many problems with the Church, Salvadoran martyr and archbishop Óscar Romero is still his greatest hero and inspiration. He has prosopagnosia, which makes it difficult to recognize familiar faces.

As of 2007, Moulitsas resides in Berkeley, California, with his two children.

== Career ==
=== Daily Kos ===
Moulitsas founded his blog, Daily Kos in May 2002, and has managed the blog as a full-time occupation since early 2004. It has become the largest liberal community blog in the United States, with over 2.3 million registered users and 8 million unique viewers per month as of July 2018.

The popularity of Daily Kos has attracted the attention of many Democratic senators, members of Congress, governors and candidates who have posted on the site, including Senators John Kerry and Barbara Boxer, Senate Majority Leader Harry Reid, Speaker of the United States House of Representatives Nancy Pelosi, former President Jimmy Carter, and former President Barack Obama. Daily Kos has also spawned an annual conference. The inaugural YearlyKos was held from June 8 to 11, 2006, in Las Vegas, Nevada. Guests included Harry Reid, then-Virginia Governor Mark Warner, and Democratic National Committee chairman Howard Dean. The conference has since been renamed Netroots Nation.

In April 2004, Moulitsas and Daily Kos made controversial comments in a blog post about Blackwater USA after some of its employees were killed and mutilated in Fallujah The next day, Moulitsas defended and clarified his remarks.

On March 17, 2008, Moulitsas wrote that Senator Hillary Clinton, who was then involved in a protracted race against Senator Barack Obama for the Democratic presidential nomination, "doesn't deserve fairness on this site" because she "fails the test of the guiding principles of this site" and because Clinton had "no reasonable chance of victory". His statement was precipitated by a "strike" conducted by several pro-Clinton diarists, even though none of these posters was paid or in any way officially linked to the site. Moulitsas responded directly to the "strike" by saying that it was more like a "boycott", noting that "It's a big Internet, so I hope they find what they're looking for."

=== Consultant and entrepreneur ===
In 2004, Markos and Jerome Armstrong of MyDD founded BlogPAC, a political action committee focused on progressive bloggers and politics online. In 2012, he was, by some measures, the most accurate major pundit to predict the result of the presidential election.

During the 2005 United Kingdom general election, Moulitsas was hired by the British daily newspaper The Guardian to write elections analysis for its weblog. Moulitsas was also a regular contributor to Newsweek, having been hired by the magazine for its 2008 presidential campaign coverage.

Moulitsas is a fellow at the New Politics Institute, a think tank of the New Democrat Network, which was founded by Simon Rosenberg in 1996. The NDN's stated purpose is to help elect centrist Democrats, and is considered by many to be a successor to the centrist Democratic Leadership Council (DLC), an organization that Simon Rosenberg resigned from in 1996.

In addition to political pursuits, Moulitsas co-founded SB Nation, a network of sports blogs, with Tyler Bleszinski (of Athletics Nation) in 2003. The network now covers all major American leagues (MLB, NBA, NFL, and NHL), as well as dozens of colleges and other specific sports like golf, cycling, and ultimate fighting.

In 2011, SB Nation became Vox Media and began expanding, raising capital to acquire and develop other blog networks. Vox Media now owns eight media brands covering news, technology, sports, and lifestyle.

In March 2018, Moulitsas announced the launch of Civiqs, a polling and data operation that tracks opinions on candidates, issues, and elected officials.

Contributing to the anthology Our American Story (2019), Moulitsas addressed the possibility of a shared American narrative. He concluded, "The American Dream claims that anyone seeking a better life can aspire to rise above their station, and everyone has an equal opportunity to become something better. That is our unifying narrative."

=== Books ===
Moulitsas has authored three books:

- Crashing the Gate: Netroots, Grassroots, and the Rise of People Powered Politics (Chelsea Green, 2006); ISBN 1-931498-99-7 (co-written with Jerome Armstrong)
- Taking On the System: Rules for Radical Change in a Digital Era (Penguin Group, 2008); ISBN 0-451-22519-8
- American Taliban: How War, Sex, Sin, and Power Bind Jihadists and the Radical Right (Polipoint Press, 2010); ISBN 1-936227-02-9

== See also ==
- Libertarian Democrat
