= MyDD =

American Politics Blog

- Website type: Progressive/Liberal blog
- Creator: Jerome Armstrong
- Website: www.mydd.com

MyDD was the first large collaborative politically progressive American politics blog. It was established by Jerome Armstrong in 2001. Its name was originally short for "My Due Diligence." In 2005, MyDD was profiled in Campaigns and Elections magazine, crediting the site with being "the first major liberal blog." In January 2006, the name was changed to "My Direct Democracy" as part of a site redesign, with the new tagline "Direct Democracy for People-Powered Politics."

== History ==
The first Dean grassroots web site was created at MyDD in April 2002. In early 2003, Joe Trippi learned of Meetup through Armstrong and MyDD. Armstrong shut down MyDD in 2003 to work on Howard Dean's presidential campaign. After lying dormant for a year, MyDD was re-launched with the Scoop blogging platform in March 2004, with blogger Chris Bowers. MyDD was instrumental in online campaigning and organizing of grassroots action to elect Howard Dean as Chairman of the Democratic National Committee in January, 2005, with "the pro-Dean site MyDD.com, which served as a key clearinghouse of information about the race."

Several early contributors to MyDD became prominent in politics on the Internet. Markos Moulitsas Zúniga, founder of the most-visited political blog in the world, Daily Kos, began commenting on MyDD before starting his own blog in May 2002, and refers to Armstrong as his "blogfather".

Armstrong attended the California State Democratic convention in Sacramento in March, 2003 with Markos Moulitsas of Daily Kos.

Mathew Gross, creator of the blog on Howard Dean's website, was another contributor to MyDD. Joe Trippi, former campaign manager for Howard Dean, met and hired Gross based on Gross' involvement with MyDD. "One day, soon after we'd moved to a larger quarters in a South Burlington office park, I looked up to see this tall young guy with an earring and a nearly shaved head wandering around the office. Security had just grabbed him and was hauling him away when he yelled out to me: 'Wait! I blog on MyDD.com!' This was, of course, the political Web site where I'd first heard about Meetup.com. 'You're hired!' I yelled."

Other notable bloggers on MyDD that went on to work with campaigns include Matt Stoller with Jon Corzine, Scott Shields with Bob Menendez, Tim Tagaris with Ned Lamont and Sherrod Brown, Melissa Ryan with Russ Feingold, Laura Packard with Debbie Stabenow and Bill Halter and Todd Beeton with Kirsten Gillibrand.

The site garnered a great deal of attention during the 2004 U.S. Presidential Election when Jerome Armstrong was the first source to break the exit polls at 1:58 PM EST.

MyDD was profiled in late 2005 as part of the article "Blogging Down the Money Trail" in Campaigns and Elections magazine. The article focused on the special election in Ohio's second congressional district and the ability of blogs like MyDD, Daily Kos, and Swing State Project to raise funds for Democratic candidates and draw national attention to local races.

During the 2006 midterm elections, MyDD's Chris Bowers launched two campaigns in October 2006 on MyDD.com before the 2006 congressional elections. The first was the "Use it or Lose it" to prompt safe Democrats to give 30 percent of their campaign funds to other Democratic causes; the second was a Google bomb campaign to raise the site listings for negative news articles on a set of Republican incumbents.

The "Use It or Lose It" campaign called on bloggers and Democratic activists to pressure Democrats in safe seats to ask them to give at least 30 percent of their campaign accounts to the Democratic Congressional Campaign Committee or directly to Democrats in competitive congressional races (subject to FEC limits). "Safe" Democrats was defined as those who were either running unopposed by a Republican, or whose Republican opponent raised less than $10,000 (and thus were not considered serious opponents). The lists of such Democrats were pulled from FEC filings. The campaign drew media attention and also brought MoveOn on board with their own page promoting the campaign.

Almost immediately after starting the "Use it or Lose It" campaign, Bowers began a Googlebomb campaign to increase the search results of a set of negative articles about endangered Republican congressional incumbents. The idea was to reach less-informed voters who might use Google to search for information on candidates, most often by simply entering the person's name. Taking advantage of the Google indexing algorithm, having many people link to these articles using the candidates' names, would raise their prominence in the search results.

The articles chosen were to be from non-partisan news sources, and factually negative about the chosen Republicans. Local news sources were preferred over national news. The chosen list included mainly such sources, but also some Wikipedia pages. The candidates chosen were culled from an initial list (chosen by Bowers) of 70, down to 52. The candidates cut were those whom a suitably credible and negative article could not be found.

The concept drew criticism from conservative bloggers although the right had used the same tactic against John Kerry in the 2004 election. In June 2007, front-pagers Matt Stoller and Chris Bowers left MyDD to found a new political blog, OpenLeft, which went online on July 9, 2007.

Founder Jerome Armstrong was known in the blogosphere for his criticisms of Democratic presidential candidate Barack Obama. "I was rooting that it would come down to Edwards and Clinton -- that to me represents a battle of Democratic values and ideas," said Armstrong. "Obama's candidacy is really just personality-driven, wrapped with quasi-religious overtures." As a result, many of the supporters of rival candidate Hillary Clinton migrated to MyDD. However, MyDD was one of the few blogs to let bloggers from all the campaigns post on the front page. Longtime editor Jonathan Singer supported the Illinois Senator, and in June 2008, Josh Orton, the Netroots Nation political director and former Online Outreach director for Barack Obama, joined MyDD as a frontpage blogger. Peter Jukes, aka "brit" on MyDD, wrote a post-cap of the Obama-Clinton primary war on MyDD, titled, "My Story: Flaming for Obama" in September, 2008 for Prospect Magazine which detailed the combative primary on MyDD. The authors of the blog during this period included Armstrong, Jonathan Singer, Josh Orton, Charles Lemos, Nathan Empsall, Jason Williams, and pseudonym authors desmoinesdemocrat, Senate Guru, and Texas Nate.

MyDD has been largely dormant since 2010. Its founder, Jerome Armstrong explained that he “had to get out to save from becoming hardened, cynical, and without peace,” citing the negativity in American politics.

Armstrong's last political post on the blog, from October 10, 2016, was entitled "A blowout of historical proportion" and predicted a crushing Clinton victory over Trump in the 2016 presidential election—one for "the record books". As of late 2019 the website is a generic product review site and no longer covers politics.
