= Daily Kos =

Blog focused on left-wing American politics

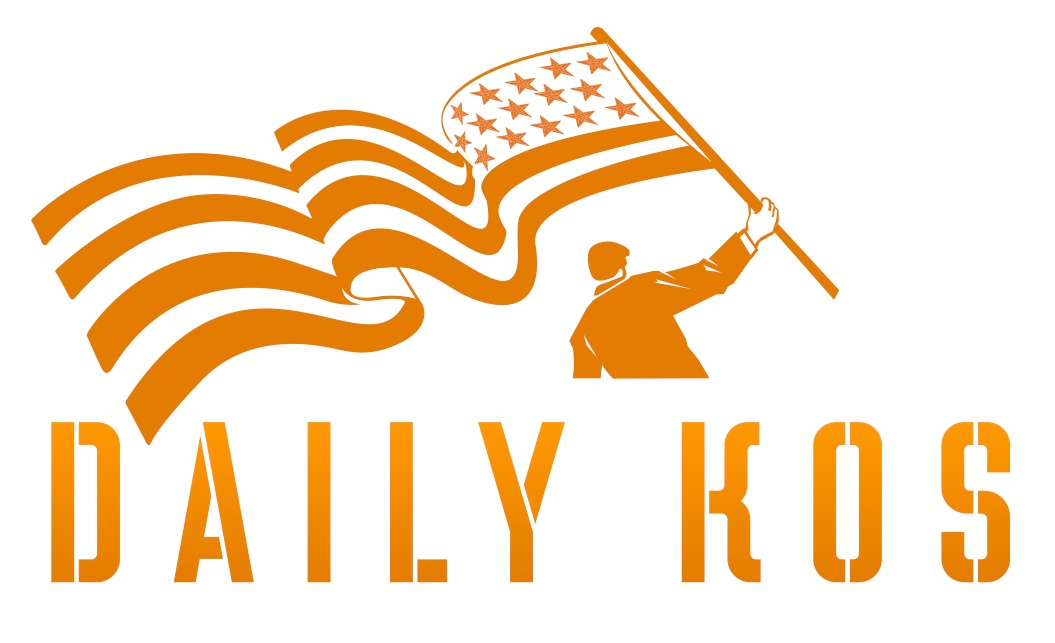
- Website type: Political blog
- Available in: English
- Owners: Kos Media, LLC
- Creator: Markos Moulitsas
- Website: www.dailykos.com
- Commercial: Yes
- Launched: May 26, 2002; 24 years ago
- Current status: Active

Daily Kos (/koʊz/ KOHZ) is a group blog and internet forum focused on the U.S. Democratic Party and on liberal and progressive American politics. The site publishes blog posts, polls, election and campaign fundraising data, and is considered an example of "netroots" activism.

Daily Kos was founded in 2002 by Markos Moulitsas and takes the name Kos from the last syllable of his first name, his nickname while in the military.

== History ==
Daily Kos was founded in May 2002 by Markos Moulitsas in Berkeley, California.

The Daily Kos is funded by advertising, fundraising, and donations.

Back in September 2014, Daily Kos has had an average weekday traffic of hundreds of thousands. According to 2026 website analytics from Semrush, Daily Kos attracts an average of 4.29 million monthly visits, though audience numbers surge significantly during presidential election cycles. The platform maintains a highly engaged, U.S.-based user base that averages over nine minutes per session reading and commenting.

The website ran on the Scoop content management system until 2011 when it moved to its own custom content management system referred to as "DK 4.0". In 2016 and 2017, the Trump presidency brought out huge support for the blog, with more than half a million in direct donations being received from their email campaigns.

In 2018, the Daily Kos launched Civiqs, a division of the blog that provides political polling data from volunteer participants.

In 2019 Prism, an independent, non-profit publication focused on covering injustice from the perspective of underrepresented groups, became an affiliate publication of the Daily Kos.

In 2020, during the COVID-19 pandemic, Daily Kos owner Kos Media LLC received $1.4 million in federally backed small business loans from Newtek Small Business Finance as part of the Paycheck Protection Program.

== Polling ==
Daily Kos had previously partnered with Research 2000 to produce polling for presidential, congressional and gubernatorial races across the country. In June 2010, Daily Kos terminated the relationship after finding that the data showed statistical anomalies consistent with deliberate falsification and announced its intention to sue the polling firm.

On November 30, 2010, an agreement to a settlement began as lawyers for the Plaintiff filed a status report indicating that both parties were "in agreement as to the contours of a proper settlement but are still in the process of determining whether the execution of the proposed terms is feasible". In May 2011, The Huffington Post reported that Research 2000 pollster Del Ali agreed to settle the lawsuit and make payments to Daily Kos.

The Daily Kos Elections tracked redistricting in the United States, forecasted Electoral College results, and provided polling data for elections.

== YearlyKos convention ==
In June 2006, members of Daily Kos organized the first ever Daily Kos political blogger convention, called YearlyKos, in Las Vegas, Nevada. The event was attended by approximately 1000 bloggers, and featured appearances by prominent Democrats such as Senate Minority Leader Harry Reid, California Senator Barbara Boxer, General Wesley Clark, Governors Mark Warner, Bill Richardson, Tom Vilsack and DNC Chair Howard Dean. The event was widely covered in the traditional media, including Capitol Hill Blue, The Boston Globe and MSNBC. C-SPAN also carried portions of the convention.

== Political activity ==
Daily Kos has been described variously as progressive, left-leaning and far-left.

In addition to being a blogging, news, and digital media platform, Daily Kos is a political organization. For instance, The New York Times reported that James Thompson, the April 2017 Democratic candidate for the vacant House seat from Kansas's 4th district, "was helped by nearly $150,000 from Daily Kos, ... and some more modest contributions from a group aligned with Senator Bernie Sanders of Vermont". OpenSecrets reported that "the liberal Daily Kos endorsed Thompson and sent out a fundraising plea, which has so far garnered $178,000 in donations, according to its fundraising page."

Daily Kos has endorsed notable Democratic candidates in state and national races, including Hillary Clinton in the run-up to the 2016 U.S. presidential election, and candidate Jon Ossoff, who ran for Georgia's 6th congressional district in its 2017 special election. Ossoff received more than $1 million raised on Daily Kos.

In 2004, the site launched the dKosopedia. It was a wiki, using the MediaWiki software, and described as "a political encyclopedia ... written from a left/progressive/liberal/Democratic point of view while also attempting to fairly acknowledge the other side's take". It grew to more than 14,000 articles but has since been discontinued.

The site has also participated in mass digital campaigns to elected officials over ActionNetwork.org with prominent organizational partners including Saphron Initiative, Futures PAC, Democracy for America's Advocacy Fund, and More Perfect Union.

== Reception ==
In 2008, Time magazine readers named Daily Kos the second-best blog. In 2009, Time listed Daily Kos in its "Most Overrated Blogs" section due to the loss of its mission, fighting the "oppressive and war-crazed" Republican administration, during Democrat Barack Obama's presidency.

In 2015, cartoonist Dan Perkins was a finalist for the Pulitzer Prize in Editorial Cartooning as Tom Tomorrow of Daily Kos.

In an October 2018 Simmons Research survey of 38 news organizations, the Daily Kos was ranked the fifth least trusted news organization by Americans in a tie with Breitbart News, with the Palmer Report, Occupy Democrats, InfoWars and The Daily Caller being lower-ranked.

In 2023, Daily Kos received a PEN Oakland/Adelle Foley Award.

== See also ==
- MyDD
