= Kurasawatrechus =

Scientific classification
- Domain: Eukaryota
- Kingdom: Animalia
- Phylum: Arthropoda
- Class: Insecta
- Order: Coleoptera
- Suborder: Adephaga
- Family: Carabidae
- Subfamily: Trechinae
- Tribe: Trechini
- Subtribe: Trechina
- Genus: Kurasawatrechus; Yoshida & Nomura, 1952

Genus of beetles

Kurasawatrechus is a genus in the beetle family Carabidae. There are more than 30 described species in Kurasawatrechus, found in Japan and South Korea.

== Species ==
These 36 species belong to the genus Kurasawatrechus:

- Kurasawatrechus aberrans Ueno, 1978 (Japan)
- Kurasawatrechus agiensis Ueno, 1975 (Japan)
- Kurasawatrechus brevicornis Ueno, 1979 (Japan)
- Kurasawatrechus chinchiro Ueno, 1974 (Japan)
- Kurasawatrechus endogaeus Ueno & Baba, 1965 (Japan)
- Kurasawatrechus eriophorus Yoshida & Nomura, 1952 (Japan)
- Kurasawatrechus fujisanus Ueno, 1971 (Japan)
- Kurasawatrechus glabratus Ueno & Namkung, 1968 (South Korea)
- Kurasawatrechus glabriventris Ueno, 1974 (Japan)
- Kurasawatrechus grandis Ueno, 1973 (Japan)
- Kurasawatrechus gujoensis Ueno, 1974 (Japan)
- Kurasawatrechus hirakei Ueno, 1979 (Japan)
- Kurasawatrechus ichihashii Ueno, 1959 (Japan)
- Kurasawatrechus intermedius Ueno, 1988 (Japan)
- Kurasawatrechus katoi Ueno, 1959 (Japan)
- Kurasawatrechus kawaguchii Ueno, 1973 (Japan)
- Kurasawatrechus kyokoae Ueno & Baba, 1974 (Japan)
- Kurasawatrechus latior Ueno & Namkung, 1968 (South Korea)
- Kurasawatrechus longipes Ueno & Namkung, 1968 (South Korea)
- Kurasawatrechus longulus Ueno, 1973 (Japan)
- Kurasawatrechus matsuii Ueno, 1999 (Japan)
- Kurasawatrechus moritai Ueno, 1979 (Japan)
- Kurasawatrechus nishikawai Ueno, 1993 (Japan)
- Kurasawatrechus notsui Uéno, 1983 (Japan)
- Kurasawatrechus ohkawai Ueno, 1988 (Japan)
- Kurasawatrechus ohshimai Ueno, 1952 (Japan)
- Kurasawatrechus quadraticollis Ueno, 1974 (Japan)
- Kurasawatrechus ryugashiensis Ueno, 1988 (Japan)
- Kurasawatrechus setiger Ueno & Namkung, 1968 (South Korea)
- Kurasawatrechus sonei Ueno, 1992 (Japan)
- Kurasawatrechus spelaeus Ueno, 1958 (Japan)
- Kurasawatrechus tanakai Ueno, 1974 (Japan)
- Kurasawatrechus torigaii Ueno, 1973 (Japan)
- Kurasawatrechus yadai Ueno & Kitayama, 2005 (Japan)
- Kurasawatrechus yamizonis Ueno, 1988 (Japan)
- Kurasawatrechus zenbai Ueno, 1990 (Japan)
