= Neotrechus =

Scientific classification
- Domain: Eukaryota
- Kingdom: Animalia
- Phylum: Arthropoda
- Class: Insecta
- Order: Coleoptera
- Suborder: Adephaga
- Family: Carabidae
- Subfamily: Trechinae
- Tribe: Trechini
- Subtribe: Trechina
- Genus: Neotrechus; G.Müller, 1913

Genus of beetles

Neotrechus is a genus in the beetle family Carabidae. There are more than 20 described species in Neotrechus.

== Species ==
These 25 species belong to the genus Neotrechus:

- Neotrechus amabilis (L.Schaufuss, 1863) (Croatia)
- Neotrechus augustae Winkler, 1926 (Bosnia-Herzegovina)
- Neotrechus dalmatinus (L.Miller, 1861) (Croatia and Bosnia-Herzegovina)
- Neotrechus ganglbaueri (Padewieth, 1891) (Croatia)
- Neotrechus hilfi (Reitter, 1903) (Bosnia-Herzegovina and former Yugoslavia)
- Neotrechus ivicensis Knirsch, 1929 (Bosnia-Herzegovina)
- Neotrechus lonae (G.Müller, 1914) (former Yugoslavia and Albania)
- Neotrechus lupoglavensis Knirsch, 1927 (Bosnia-Herzegovina)
- Neotrechus malissorum (G.Müller, 1914) (Albania)
- Neotrechus moraveci Janak, 2009 (Croatia)
- Neotrechus muharnicensis Knirsch, 1927 (Bosnia-Herzegovina)
- Neotrechus noesskei (Apfelbeck, 1908) (Bosnia-Herzegovina and former Yugoslavia)
- Neotrechus oreophilus Knirsch, 1927 (Bosnia-Herzegovina)
- Neotrechus ottonis (Reitter, 1905) (Bosnia-Herzegovina)
- Neotrechus paganettii (Ganglbauer, 1897) (Croatia and former Yugoslavia)
- Neotrechus parvicollis Winkler, 1926 (Bosnia-Herzegovina)
- Neotrechus setniki (Reitter, 1904) (Bosnia-Herzegovina and former Yugoslavia)
- Neotrechus silvaticus Winkler, 1926 (Bosnia-Herzegovina)
- Neotrechus speluncarius (Reitter, 1916) (Bosnia-Herzegovina)
- Neotrechus striatipennis G.Müller, 1931 (Bosnia-Herzegovina)
- Neotrechus suturalis (L.Schaufuss, 1864) (Croatia, Bosnia-Herzegovina, former Yugoslavia, Albania)
- Neotrechus terrenus Knirsch, 1929 (Bosnia-Herzegovina)
- Neotrechus vonickai Janak & P.Moravec, 2018 (Albania)
- Neotrechus weiratheri Winkler, 1926 (Bosnia-Herzegovina)
- Neotrechus winneguthi Scheibel, 1937 (Croatia)
