= Trechodes =

Scientific classification
- Domain: Eukaryota
- Kingdom: Animalia
- Phylum: Arthropoda
- Class: Insecta
- Order: Coleoptera
- Suborder: Adephaga
- Family: Carabidae
- Subfamily: Trechinae
- Tribe: Trechini
- Subtribe: Trechodina
- Genus: Trechodes; Blackburn, 1901

Genus of beetles

Trechodes is a genus of in the beetle family Carabidae. There are more than 20 described species in Trechodes.

== Species ==
These 25 species belong to the genus Trechodes:

- Trechodes alluaudi Jeannel, 1926 (Madagascar)
- Trechodes babaulti Jeannel, 1926 (Africa)
- Trechodes bakeri Jeannel, 1926 (Philippines)
- Trechodes bipartitus (W.J.MacLeay, 1871) (Australia)
- Trechodes bitinctus (Sloane, 1923) (Australia)
- Trechodes cauliops (Bates, 1892) (Myanmar)
- Trechodes crypticus B.Moore, 1972 (Australia)
- Trechodes daffneri Casale, 1986 (Democratic Republic of the Congo)
- Trechodes jeanneli Mateu, 1958 (Madagascar)
- Trechodes katanganus Basilewsky, 1958 (Democratic Republic of the Congo)
- Trechodes kenyensis Jeannel, 1926 (Kenya)
- Trechodes kilimanus Jeannel, 1926 (Kenya and Tanzania)
- Trechodes laophilus Deuve, 2002 (Thailand and Laos)
- Trechodes lebioderus (Chaudoir, 1876) (Ethiopia)
- Trechodes leclerci Deuve, 1987 (Thailand)
- Trechodes leleupi Basilewsky, 1950 (Democratic Republic of the Congo)
- Trechodes lepesmei Villiers, 1940 (Cameroon)
- Trechodes lucanerii Magrini; Sciaky & Bastianini, 2005 (Ethiopia)
- Trechodes lustrans B.Moore, 1972 (Australia)
- Trechodes marshalli Jeannel, 1926 (Tanzania, Zimbabwe, and South Africa)
- Trechodes palawanensis Deuve, 2001 (Philippines)
- Trechodes satoi Ueno, 1990 (Thailand)
- Trechodes secalioides (Blackburn, 1891) (Australia)
- Trechodes sicardi Alluaud, 1932 (Madagascar)
- Trechodes vadoni Jeannel, 1946 (Madagascar)
