= Boldoriella =

Scientific classification
- Domain: Eukaryota
- Kingdom: Animalia
- Phylum: Arthropoda
- Class: Insecta
- Order: Coleoptera
- Suborder: Adephaga
- Family: Carabidae
- Subfamily: Trechinae
- Tribe: Trechini
- Subtribe: Trechina
- Genus: Boldoriella; Jeannel, 1928

Subgenera
- Boldoriella Jeannel, 1928; Insubrites Monguzzi, 1982

Genus of beetles

Boldoriella is a genus in the beetle family Carabidae. There are more than 20 described species in Boldoriella, found in Switzerland and Italy.

== Species ==
These 21 species belong to the genus Boldoriella:

- Boldoriella binaghii Bucciarelli, 1978 (Italy)
- Boldoriella brembana (Binaghi, 1937) (Italy)
- Boldoriella brigantiae Monguzzi & Regalin, 2001 (Italy)
- Boldoriella carminatii (Dodero, 1917) (Italy)
- Boldoriella chiarae Monguzzi, 1982 (Italy)
- Boldoriella concii Monguzzi, 1982 (Italy)
- Boldoriella focarilei (R.Rossi, 1965) (Italy)
- Boldoriella gratiae Bucciarelli, 1978 (Italy)
- Boldoriella grignensis Monzini, 1987 (Italy)
- Boldoriella humeralis (Dodero, 1924) (Italy)
- Boldoriella knauthi (Ganglbauer, 1904) (Italy)
- Boldoriella manzoniana Monzini, 1995 (Italy)
- Boldoriella monguzzii Bucciarelli, 1978 (Italy)
- Boldoriella pedersolii Grottolo, 2015 (Italy)
- Boldoriella pesarinii Sciaky, 1982 (Italy)
- Boldoriella pozziae (B.Bari, 1957) (Italy)
- Boldoriella serianensis (Breit, 1913) (Italy)
- Boldoriella silvanae Monzini, 1995 (Italy)
- Boldoriella tedeschii (Sciaky, 1977) (Switzerland and Italy)
- Boldoriella trezzii Monguzzi, 2019 (Italy)
- Boldoriella verbanensis Monguzzi, 2016 (Switzerland and Italy)
