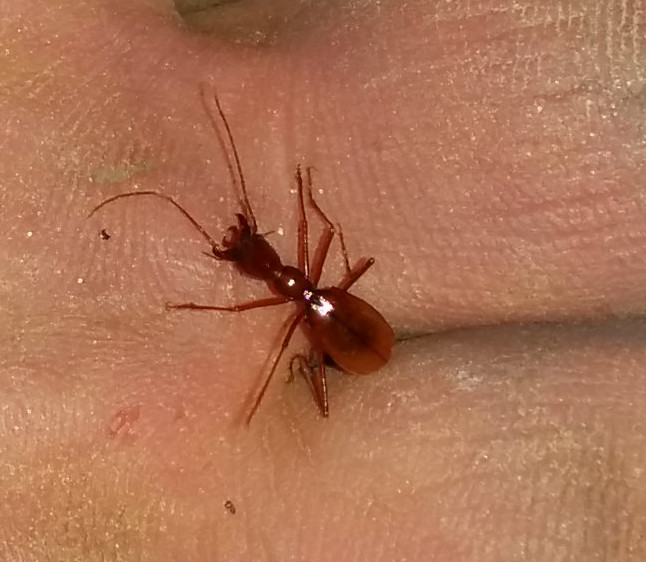
- Italaphaenops dimaioi

Scientific classification
- Domain: Eukaryota
- Kingdom: Animalia
- Phylum: Arthropoda
- Class: Insecta
- Order: Coleoptera
- Suborder: Adephaga
- Family: Carabidae
- Tribe: Trechini
- Subtribe: Trechina
- Genus: Italaphaenops; Ghidini, 1964
- Species: I. dimaioi

Binomial name
- Italaphaenops dimaioi Ghidini, 1964

= Italaphaenops =

Genus of beetles

Italaphaenops is a genus in the ground beetle family Carabidae. This genus has a single species, Italaphaenops dimaioi. It is found in Italy.
