= Kusumia =

Scientific classification
- Domain: Eukaryota
- Kingdom: Animalia
- Phylum: Arthropoda
- Class: Insecta
- Order: Coleoptera
- Suborder: Adephaga
- Family: Carabidae
- Subfamily: Trechinae
- Tribe: Trechini
- Subtribe: Trechina
- Genus: Kusumia; Ueno, 1952

Genus of beetles

Kusumia is a genus in the beetle family Carabidae. There are more than 20 described species in Kusumia, found in Japan.

== Species ==
These 22 species belong to the genus Kusumia:

- Kusumia amicorum Ueno, 1999
- Kusumia australis Ueno, 1999
- Kusumia crocodilus Ueno, 2005
- Kusumia dentata Ueno, 1999
- Kusumia elongata Ueno, 1999
- Kusumia fusipennis Ueno & Nishikawa, 2001
- Kusumia gelida Ueno & Naito, 2003
- Kusumia hatenashiana Ueno, 2002
- Kusumia insperata Ueno, 2005
- Kusumia kitayamai Ashida, 2000
- Kusumia laticollis Ueno, 1999
- Kusumia latior Ueno, 1999
- Kusumia longicollis Ueno, 1999
- Kusumia militis Ueno & Naito, 2005
- Kusumia obaco Ueno & Naito, 2005
- Kusumia rotundata Ueno & Naito, 2005
- Kusumia septentrionalis Ueno, 2002
- Kusumia takahashii (Ueno, 1952)
- Kusumia tanakai Ueno, 1999
- Kusumia variabilis Ueno & Naito, 2005
- Kusumia yoshikawai Ueno, 1960
- Kusumia yosiiana Ueno, 1960
