= Neoblemus =

Scientific classification
- Domain: Eukaryota
- Kingdom: Animalia
- Phylum: Arthropoda
- Class: Insecta
- Order: Coleoptera
- Suborder: Adephaga
- Family: Carabidae
- Subfamily: Trechinae
- Tribe: Trechini
- Subtribe: Perileptina
- Genus: Neoblemus; Jeannel, 1923

Synonyms
- Elliblemus Donabauer, 1995

Genus of beetles

Neoblemus is a genus in the ground beetle family Carabidae. There are about 10 described species in Neoblemus.

== Species ==
These 10 species belong to the genus Neoblemus:

- Neoblemus andrewesi Jeannel, 1923 (India)
- Neoblemus bedoci Jeannel, 1923 (China, Vietnam)
- Neoblemus championi Jeannel, 1923 (India)
- Neoblemus dostali Donabauer, 1995 (Turkmenistan)
- Neoblemus gilleforsi Jeanne, 1996 (Turkey)
- Neoblemus glazunovi Jeannel, 1935 (Iran, Kazakhstan, Uzbekistan, Turkmenistan, Kyrgyzstan, Tadzhikistan)
- Neoblemus jeannei Pupier, 2006 (Greece)
- Neoblemus kubani Deuve, 2006 (Laos)
- Neoblemus samai Magrini & Pavesi, 2003 (Iran)
- Neoblemus zetteli Donabauer, 1995 (Indonesia, Borneo)
