= Trechosia =

Scientific classification
- Domain: Eukaryota
- Kingdom: Animalia
- Phylum: Arthropoda
- Class: Insecta
- Order: Coleoptera
- Suborder: Adephaga
- Family: Carabidae
- Subfamily: Trechinae
- Tribe: Trechini
- Subtribe: Trechodina
- Genus: Trechosia; Jeannel, 1926

Genus of beetles

Trechosia is a genus in the beetle family Carabidae. There are about 12 described species in Trechosia.

== Species ==
These 12 species belong to the genus Trechosia:

- Trechosia aberdarensis Jeannel, 1935 (Kenya)
- Trechosia ambigua (Péringuey, 1896) (South Africa)
- Trechosia aterrima (Péringuey, 1896) (South Africa)
- Trechosia dollmani Jeannel, 1960 (Zambia)
- Trechosia humeralis Jeannel, 1930 (South Africa)
- Trechosia intermedia Geginat, 2007 (South Africa)
- Trechosia kogelbergensis Geginat, 2007 (South Africa)
- Trechosia leleupi Jeannel, 1964 (South Africa)
- Trechosia monticola (Péringuey, 1926) (South Africa)
- Trechosia montistabulae Jeannel, 1964 (South Africa)
- Trechosia natalensis Jeannel, 1960 (South Africa)
- Trechosia solutilis (Péringuey, 1908) (Zimbabwe and South Africa)
