= Cnides =

Scientific classification
- Kingdom: Animalia
- Phylum: Arthropoda
- Class: Insecta
- Order: Coleoptera
- Suborder: Adephaga
- Family: Carabidae
- Subfamily: Trechinae
- Tribe: Trechini
- Subtribe: Trechodina
- Genus: Cnides; Motschulsky, 1862

Genus of beetles

Cnides is a genus in the beetle family Carabidae. There are about 11 described species in Cnides, found in Central and South America.

== Species ==
These 11 species belong to the genus Cnides:

- Cnides angustatus (Solier, 1849)
- Cnides brevipennis Jeannel, 1938 (Ecuador)
- Cnides chaparensis Trezzi & Guzzetti, 2017 (Bolivia)
- Cnides dostali Donabauer, 2013 (Ecuador)
- Cnides jeanneli Ueno, 1985 (Colombia and Ecuador)
- Cnides longestriatus Emden, 1949 (Brazil)
- Cnides longulus Jeannel, 1958 (Brazil)
- Cnides obtusus Jeannel, 1958 (Venezuela)
- Cnides putzeysi Jeannel, 1927 (Uruguay)
- Cnides rostratus Motschulsky, 1862 (Colombia, Panama, and Costa Rica)
- Cnides spinicollis Jeannel, 1937 (Brazil)
