= Guizhaphaenops =

Scientific classification
- Domain: Eukaryota
- Kingdom: Animalia
- Phylum: Arthropoda
- Class: Insecta
- Order: Coleoptera
- Suborder: Adephaga
- Family: Carabidae
- Subfamily: Trechinae
- Tribe: Trechini
- Subtribe: Trechina
- Genus: Guizhaphaenops; Vigna Taglianti, 1997

Subgenera
- Guizhaphaenops Vigna Taglianti, 1997; Semiaphaenops Deuve, 2000

Genus of beetles

Guizhaphaenops is a genus in the beetle family Carabidae. There are about eight described species in Guizhaphaenops, found in China.

== Species ==
These eight species belong to the genus Guizhaphaenops:

- Guizhaphaenops giganteus Ueno, 2000
- Guizhaphaenops lipsorum Deuve, 2000
- Guizhaphaenops martii Deuve, 2001
- Guizhaphaenops pouillyi Deuve & Queinnec, 2014
- Guizhaphaenops striatus Ueno, 2000
- Guizhaphaenops yudongensis Deuve & Tian, 2016
- Guizhaphaenops zhijinensis Ueno & Ran, 2004
- Guizhaphaenops zorzini Vigna Taglianti, 1997
