= Porocimmerites =

Scientific classification
- Domain: Eukaryota
- Kingdom: Animalia
- Phylum: Arthropoda
- Class: Insecta
- Order: Coleoptera
- Suborder: Adephaga
- Family: Carabidae
- Subfamily: Trechinae
- Tribe: Trechini
- Subtribe: Trechina
- Genus: Porocimmerites; Belousov, 1998

Genus of beetles

Porocimmerites is a genus in the ground beetle family Carabidae. There are about 10 described species in Porocimmerites, found in Russia.

== Species ==
These 10 species belong to the genus Porocimmerites:

- Porocimmerites angustus Belousov, 1998
- Porocimmerites bisetosus Belousov, 1998
- Porocimmerites circassicus (Reitter, 1888)
- Porocimmerites dentatus Belousov, 1998
- Porocimmerites imitator Belousov, 1998
- Porocimmerites mirabilis Belousov, 1998
- Porocimmerites politus Belousov, 1998
- Porocimmerites reticulatus Belousov, 1998
- Porocimmerites shakhensis Belousov, 1998
- Porocimmerites ubykh Belousov, 1998
