= Pheggomisetes =

Scientific classification
- Domain: Eukaryota
- Kingdom: Animalia
- Phylum: Arthropoda
- Class: Insecta
- Order: Coleoptera
- Suborder: Adephaga
- Family: Carabidae
- Subfamily: Trechinae
- Tribe: Trechini
- Subtribe: Trechina
- Genus: Pheggomisetes; Knirsch, 1923

Genus of beetles

Pheggomisetes is a genus in the beetle family Carabidae. There are at least four described species in Pheggomisetes.

== Species ==
These four species belong to the genus Pheggomisetes:

- Pheggomisetes buresi (Knirsch, 1923) (former Yugoslavia, Serbia, and Bulgaria)
- Pheggomisetes globiceps Buresch, 1925 (former Yugoslavia, Serbia, and Bulgaria)
- Pheggomisetes radevi Knirsch, 1924 (Bulgaria)
- Pheggomisetes serbicus S.Curcic; Vrbica & B.Gueorguiev, 2018 (former Yugoslavia and Serbia)
