= Ushijimaella =

Scientific classification
- Domain: Eukaryota
- Kingdom: Animalia
- Phylum: Arthropoda
- Class: Insecta
- Order: Coleoptera
- Suborder: Adephaga
- Family: Carabidae
- Subfamily: Trechinae
- Tribe: Trechini
- Subtribe: Trechina
- Genus: Ushijimaella; Ueno, 1980

Genus of beetles

Ushijimaella is a genus in the beetle family Carabidae. There are about six described species in Ushijimaella.

== Species ==
These six species belong to the genus Ushijimaella:

- Ushijimaella lucida Belousov & Kabak, 2003 (China)
- Ushijimaella ollivieri Deuve & Queinnec, 2014 (China)
- Ushijimaella pilosistriata Ueno, 1980 (South Korea)
- Ushijimaella silvatica P.Moravec & Wrase, 1998 (China)
- Ushijimaella uenoi P.Moravec & Wrase, 1998 (China)
- Ushijimaella zvarici Belousov & Kabak, 2003 (China)
