= Meganophthalmus =

Scientific classification
- Domain: Eukaryota
- Kingdom: Animalia
- Phylum: Arthropoda
- Class: Insecta
- Order: Coleoptera
- Suborder: Adephaga
- Family: Carabidae
- Subfamily: Trechinae
- Tribe: Trechini
- Subtribe: Trechina
- Genus: Meganophthalmus; Kurnakov, 1959

Genus of beetles

Meganophthalmus is a genus in the ground beetle family Carabidae. There are about five described species in Meganophthalmus, found in Russia and Georgia.

== Species ==
These five species belong to the genus Meganophthalmus:

- Meganophthalmus irinae Belousov & Zamotajlov, 1999 (Russia)
- Meganophthalmus kravetzi Komarov, 1993 (Russia)
- Meganophthalmus kutaissianus (Zaitzev, 1941) (Georgia)
- Meganophthalmus medvedevi Belousov & Koval, 2009 (Georgia)
- Meganophthalmus mirabilis Kurnakov, 1959 (Georgia)
