= Sinotrechiama =

Scientific classification
- Domain: Eukaryota
- Kingdom: Animalia
- Phylum: Arthropoda
- Class: Insecta
- Order: Coleoptera
- Suborder: Adephaga
- Family: Carabidae
- Subfamily: Trechinae
- Tribe: Trechini
- Subtribe: Trechina
- Genus: Sinotrechiama; Ueno, 2000

Genus of beetles

Sinotrechiama is a genus in the beetle family Carabidae. There are about six described species in Sinotrechiama, found in China.

== Species ==
These six species belong to the genus Sinotrechiama:

- Sinotrechiama duboisi Deuve, 2004
- Sinotrechiama imitator Belousov & Kabak, 2003
- Sinotrechiama parvus Ueno, 2006
- Sinotrechiama pilifer Belousov & Kabak, 2003
- Sinotrechiama tronqueti (Deuve, 1995)
- Sinotrechiama yunnanus Belousov; Kabak & Liang, 2019
