= Sinotroglodytes =

Scientific classification
- Domain: Eukaryota
- Kingdom: Animalia
- Phylum: Arthropoda
- Class: Insecta
- Order: Coleoptera
- Suborder: Adephaga
- Family: Carabidae
- Subfamily: Trechinae
- Tribe: Trechini
- Subtribe: Trechina
- Genus: Sinotroglodytes; Deuve, 1996

Genus of beetles

Sinotroglodytes is a genus in the beetle family Carabidae. There are about five described species in Sinotroglodytes, found in China.

== Species ==
These five species belong to the genus Sinotroglodytes:

- Sinotroglodytes ariagnoi Deuve, 2016
- Sinotroglodytes bedosae Deuve, 1996
- Sinotroglodytes hefengensis Tian; Huang & Li, 2021
- Sinotroglodytes hygrophilus Ueno, 2009
- Sinotroglodytes yanwangi Huang; Tian & Faille, 2020
