= Coreoblemus =

Scientific classification
- Kingdom: Animalia
- Phylum: Arthropoda
- Class: Insecta
- Order: Coleoptera
- Suborder: Adephaga
- Family: Carabidae
- Subfamily: Trechinae
- Tribe: Trechini
- Subtribe: Trechina
- Genus: Coreoblemus; Ueno, 1969

Genus of beetles

Coreoblemus is a genus in the ground beetle family Carabidae. There are about five described species in Coreoblemus, found in Japan and Korea.

== Species ==
These five species belong to the genus Coreoblemus:

- Coreoblemus miyamai Ueno, 2007 (Japan)
- Coreoblemus namkungi Park; Lafer & Sone, 2002 (South Korea)
- † Coreoblemus parvicollis Ueno, 1969 (South Korea)
- Coreoblemus sejimai Ueno, 2007 (Japan)
- Coreoblemus venustus Ueno, 1969 (Japan)
