= Incatrechus =

Scientific classification
- Domain: Eukaryota
- Kingdom: Animalia
- Phylum: Arthropoda
- Class: Insecta
- Order: Coleoptera
- Suborder: Adephaga
- Family: Carabidae
- Subfamily: Trechinae
- Tribe: Trechini
- Subtribe: Trechina
- Genus: Incatrechus; Mateu & Belles, 1982

Genus of beetles

Incatrechus is a genus in the ground beetle family Carabidae. There are at least four described species in Incatrechus, found in Peru.

== Species ==
These four species belong to the genus Incatrechus:

- Incatrechus lagunensis Mateu & M.Etonti, 2006
- Incatrechus pilosus Mateu & Belles, 1982
- Incatrechus rattii M.Etonti & Mateu, 2000
- Incatrechus tenuis M.Etonti & Mateu, 2002
