= Mimotrechus =

Scientific classification
- Domain: Eukaryota
- Kingdom: Animalia
- Phylum: Arthropoda
- Class: Insecta
- Order: Coleoptera
- Suborder: Adephaga
- Family: Carabidae
- Subfamily: Trechinae
- Tribe: Trechini
- Subtribe: Trechina
- Genus: Mimotrechus; B.Moore, 1972

Genus of beetles

Mimotrechus is a genus in the ground beetle family Carabidae. There are at least four described species in Mimotrechus, found in Australia.

== Species ==
These four species belong to the genus Mimotrechus:

- Mimotrechus australiensis (Sloane, 1923)
- Mimotrechus carteri (Sloane, 1920)
- Mimotrechus obscuroguttatus B.Moore, 1972
- Mimotrechus scitulus B.Moore, 1972
