= Minimaphaenops =

Scientific classification
- Domain: Eukaryota
- Kingdom: Animalia
- Phylum: Arthropoda
- Class: Insecta
- Order: Coleoptera
- Suborder: Adephaga
- Family: Carabidae
- Subfamily: Trechinae
- Tribe: Trechini
- Subtribe: Trechina
- Genus: Minimaphaenops; Deuve, 2000

Subgenera
- Enshiaphaenops Deuve, 2016; Minimaphaenops Deuve, 2000

Genus of beetles

Minimaphaenops is a genus in the beetle family Carabidae. There are at least two described species in Minimaphaenops, found in China.

== Species ==
These two species belong to the genus Minimaphaenops:

- Minimaphaenops lipsae Deuve, 2000 (China)
- Minimaphaenops senecali Deuve, 2016 (China)
