= Uenotrechus =

Scientific classification
- Kingdom: Animalia
- Phylum: Arthropoda
- Class: Insecta
- Order: Coleoptera
- Suborder: Adephaga
- Family: Carabidae
- Subfamily: Trechinae
- Tribe: Trechini
- Subtribe: Trechina
- Genus: Uenotrechus; Deuve & Tian, 1999

Genus of beetles

Uenotrechus is a genus in the beetle family Carabidae. There are at least four described species in Uenotrechus, found in China.

== Species ==
These four species belong to the genus Uenotrechus:

- Uenotrechus deuvei Tian & Chen, 2017
- Uenotrechus gejianbangi Tian & Wei, 2017
- Uenotrechus liboensis Deuve & Tian, 1999
- Uenotrechus nandanensis Deuve & Tian, 2011
