= Kupetrechus =

Scientific classification
- Domain: Eukaryota
- Kingdom: Animalia
- Phylum: Arthropoda
- Class: Insecta
- Order: Coleoptera
- Suborder: Adephaga
- Family: Carabidae
- Subfamily: Trechinae
- Tribe: Trechini
- Subtribe: Trechina
- Genus: Kupetrechus; Larochelle & Larivière, 2007

Genus of beetles

Kupetrechus is a genus in the ground beetle family Carabidae. There are at least three described species in Kupetrechus, found in New Zealand.

== Species ==
These three species belong to the genus Kupetrechus:

- Kupetrechus gracilis Townsend, 2010
- Kupetrechus lamberti (Britton, 1960)
- Kupetrechus larsonae Townsend, 2010
