= Eotrechodes =

Scientific classification
- Domain: Eukaryota
- Kingdom: Animalia
- Phylum: Arthropoda
- Class: Insecta
- Order: Coleoptera
- Suborder: Adephaga
- Family: Carabidae
- Subfamily: Trechinae
- Tribe: Trechini
- Subtribe: Trechodina
- Genus: Eotrechodes; Ueno & Lafer&Sundukov, 1995
- Species: E. larisae

Binomial name
- Eotrechodes larisae Ueno; Lafer & Sundukov, 1995

Genus of beetles

Eotrechodes is a genus in the ground beetle family Carabidae. This genus has a single species, Eotrechodes larisae, found in Russia.
