= Libotrechus =

Scientific classification
- Domain: Eukaryota
- Kingdom: Animalia
- Phylum: Arthropoda
- Class: Insecta
- Order: Coleoptera
- Suborder: Adephaga
- Family: Carabidae
- Subfamily: Trechinae
- Tribe: Trechini
- Subtribe: Trechina
- Genus: Libotrechus; Ueno, 1998

Genus of beetles

Libotrechus is a genus in the beetle family Carabidae. There are at least two described species in Libotrechus, found in China.

== Species ==
These two species belong to the genus Libotrechus:

- Libotrechus duanensis Lin & Tian, 2014
- Libotrechus nishikawai Ueno, 1998
