= Luyatrechus =

Luyatrechus cuelapensis

Scientific classification
- Kingdom: Animalia
- Phylum: Arthropoda
- Class: Insecta
- Order: Coleoptera
- Suborder: Adephaga
- Family: Carabidae
- Subfamily: Trechinae
- Genus: Luyatrechus; M.Etonti & Mateu, 2000
- Species: L. cuelapensis

Binomial name
- Luyatrechus cuelapensis M.Etonti & Mateu, 2000

Genus of beetles

Luyatrechus cuelapensis is a species of beetle in the family Carabidae, the only species in the genus Luyatrechus. There are currently 0 confirmed observations of Luyatrechus.
