= Columbitrechus =

Scientific classification
- Kingdom: Animalia
- Phylum: Arthropoda
- Clade: Pancrustacea
- Class: Insecta
- Order: Coleoptera
- Suborder: Adephaga
- Family: Carabidae
- Subfamily: Trechinae
- Tribe: Trechini
- Subtribe: Trechina
- Genus: Columbitrechus; Mateu, 1982
- Species: C. subsulcatus

Binomial name
- Columbitrechus subsulcatus Mateu, 1982

Genus of beetles

Columbitrechus is a genus in the ground beetle family Carabidae. This genus has a single species, Columbitrechus subsulcatus. It is found in Colombia.
