= Homaloderodes =

Scientific classification
- Domain: Eukaryota
- Kingdom: Animalia
- Phylum: Arthropoda
- Class: Insecta
- Order: Coleoptera
- Suborder: Adephaga
- Family: Carabidae
- Tribe: Trechini
- Subtribe: Trechina
- Genus: Homaloderodes; Jeannel, 1962
- Species: H. germaini

Binomial name
- Homaloderodes germaini Jeannel, 1962

Genus of beetles

Homaloderodes germaini is a species of beetle in the family Carabidae, the only species in the genus Homaloderodes. It has been found in the Araucanía, Los Lagos, and Biobío regions of Chile.
