= Taiwanotrechus =

Scientific classification
- Domain: Eukaryota
- Kingdom: Animalia
- Phylum: Arthropoda
- Class: Insecta
- Order: Coleoptera
- Suborder: Adephaga
- Family: Carabidae
- Subfamily: Trechinae
- Tribe: Trechini
- Subtribe: Trechina
- Genus: Taiwanotrechus; Ueno, 1987
- Species: T. subglobosus

Binomial name
- Taiwanotrechus subglobosus Ueno, 1987

Genus of beetles

Taiwanotrechus subglobosus is a species of beetle in the family Carabidae, the only species in the genus Taiwanotrechus.
