= Gulaphaenops =

Scientific classification
- Domain: Eukaryota
- Kingdom: Animalia
- Phylum: Arthropoda
- Class: Insecta
- Order: Coleoptera
- Suborder: Adephaga
- Family: Carabidae
- Tribe: Trechini
- Subtribe: Trechina
- Genus: Gulaphaenops; Ueno, 1987
- Species: G. leptodiroides

Binomial name
- Gulaphaenops leptodiroides Ueno, 1987

Genus of beetles

Gulaphaenops is a genus of carabids in the beetle family Carabidae. This genus has a single species, Gulaphaenops leptodiroides. It is found in South Korea.
