= Himalaphaenops =

Scientific classification
- Domain: Eukaryota
- Kingdom: Animalia
- Phylum: Arthropoda
- Class: Insecta
- Order: Coleoptera
- Suborder: Adephaga
- Family: Carabidae
- Tribe: Trechini
- Subtribe: Trechina
- Genus: Himalaphaenops; Ueno, 1980
- Species: H. nishikawai

Binomial name
- Himalaphaenops nishikawai Ueno, 1980

Genus of beetles

Himalaphaenops is a genus in the ground beetle family Carabidae. This genus has a single species, Himalaphaenops nishikawai. It is found in Nepal.
