= Sbordoniella =

Scientific classification
- Domain: Eukaryota
- Kingdom: Animalia
- Phylum: Arthropoda
- Class: Insecta
- Order: Coleoptera
- Suborder: Adephaga
- Family: Carabidae
- Tribe: Trechini
- Subtribe: Trechina
- Genus: Sbordoniella; Vigna Taglianti, 1980
- Species: S. indagi

Binomial name
- Sbordoniella indagi Vigna Taglianti, 1980

Genus of beetles

Sbordoniella is a genus in the ground beetle family Carabidae. This genus has a single species, Sbordoniella indagi. It is found in Turkey.
