= Chaetotrechiama =

Scientific classification
- Domain: Eukaryota
- Kingdom: Animalia
- Phylum: Arthropoda
- Class: Insecta
- Order: Coleoptera
- Suborder: Adephaga
- Family: Carabidae
- Tribe: Trechini
- Subtribe: Trechina
- Genus: Chaetotrechiama; Ueno, 1982
- Species: C. procerus

Binomial name
- Chaetotrechiama procerus Ueno, 1982

Genus of beetles

Chaetotrechiama is a genus in the ground beetle family Carabidae. This genus has a single species, Chaetotrechiama procerus. It is found in Japan.
