= Oarotrechus =

Scientific classification
- Domain: Eukaryota
- Kingdom: Animalia
- Phylum: Arthropoda
- Class: Insecta
- Order: Coleoptera
- Suborder: Adephaga
- Family: Carabidae
- Tribe: Trechini
- Subtribe: Aepina
- Genus: Oarotrechus; Townsend, 2010
- Species: O. gracilentus

Binomial name
- Oarotrechus gracilentus Townsend, 2010

Genus of beetles

Oarotrechus is a genus in the ground beetle family Carabidae. This genus has a single species, Oarotrechus gracilentus. It is found in New Zealand.
