= Scototrechus =

Scientific classification
- Kingdom: Animalia
- Phylum: Arthropoda
- Clade: Pancrustacea
- Class: Insecta
- Order: Coleoptera
- Suborder: Adephaga
- Family: Carabidae
- Subfamily: Trechinae
- Genus: Scototrechus; Britton, 1962

Genus of beetles

Scototrechus orcinus illustrated by Des Helmore

Scototrechus is a genus of beetles in the family Carabidae, containing the following species:

- Scototrechus hardingi Townsend, 2010
- Scototrechus morti Townsend, 2010
- Scototrechus orcinus Britton, 1962
