= Caucasaphaenops =

Caucasaphaenops malchanovi

Scientific classification
- Kingdom: Animalia
- Phylum: Arthropoda
- Class: Insecta
- Order: Coleoptera
- Suborder: Adephaga
- Family: Carabidae
- Subfamily: Trechinae
- Genus: Caucasaphaenops; Belousov, 1999
- Species: C. malchanovi

Binomial name
- Caucasaphaenops malchanovi Belousov, 1999

Genus of beetles

Caucasaphaenops malchanovi is a species of beetle in the family Carabidae, the only species in the genus Caucasaphaenops.
