= Taniatrechus =

Taniatrechus setosus

Scientific classification
- Kingdom: Animalia
- Phylum: Arthropoda
- Class: Insecta
- Order: Coleoptera
- Suborder: Adephaga
- Family: Carabidae
- Subfamily: Trechinae
- Genus: Taniatrechus; Belousov & Dolzhanski, 1994
- Species: T. setosus

Binomial name
- Taniatrechus setosus Belousov & Dolzhanski, 1994

Genus of beetles

Taniatrechus setosus is a species of beetle in the family Carabidae, the only species in the genus Taniatrechus.
