= Masuzoa =

Scientific classification
- Kingdom: Animalia
- Phylum: Arthropoda
- Class: Insecta
- Order: Coleoptera
- Suborder: Adephaga
- Family: Carabidae
- Subfamily: Trechinae
- Genus: Masuzoa; Ueno, 1960

Genus of beetles

Masuzoa is a genus of beetles in the family Carabidae, containing the following species:

- Masuzoa baicalensis Shilenkov & Anichtchenko, 2008
- Masuzoa notabilis Ueno, 1960
- Masuzoa ussuriensis Lafer, 1989
