= Trechicomimus =

Scientific classification
- Kingdom: Animalia
- Phylum: Arthropoda
- Class: Insecta
- Order: Coleoptera
- Suborder: Adephaga
- Family: Carabidae
- Subfamily: Trechinae
- Genus: Trechicomimus; Mateu & Negre, 1972

Genus of beetles

Trechicomimus is a genus of beetles in the family Carabidae, containing the following species. They are found in Chile.

- Trechicomimus aphaenops Mateu & Negre, 1972
- Trechicomimus suturalis Ueno, 1977
