= Apoplotrechus =

Scientific classification
- Kingdom: Animalia
- Phylum: Arthropoda
- Class: Insecta
- Order: Coleoptera
- Suborder: Adephaga
- Family: Carabidae
- Subfamily: Trechinae
- Genus: Apoplotrechus; Alluaud, 1915

Genus of beetles

Apoplotrechus is a genus of beetles in the family Carabidae, containing the following species:

- Apoplotrechus hollandei Mateu, 1983
- Apoplotrechus strigipennis (Fairmaire, 1903)
