= Macrocheilus lindemannae =

Scientific classification
- Kingdom: Animalia
- Phylum: Arthropoda
- Clade: Pancrustacea
- Class: Insecta
- Order: Coleoptera
- Suborder: Adephaga
- Family: Carabidae
- Genus: Macrocheilus
- Species: M. lindemannae

Binomial name
- Macrocheilus lindemannae Jedlicka, 1963

Species of beetle

Macrocheilus lindemannae is a species of ground beetle in the subfamily Anthiinae. It was described by Jedlicka in 1963.
