= Macrocheilus hybridus =

Scientific classification
- Kingdom: Animalia
- Phylum: Arthropoda
- Clade: Pancrustacea
- Class: Insecta
- Order: Coleoptera
- Suborder: Adephaga
- Family: Carabidae
- Genus: Macrocheilus
- Species: M. hybridus

Binomial name
- Macrocheilus hybridus Peringuey, 1896

Species of beetle

Macrocheilus hybridus is a species of ground beetle in the subfamily Anthiinae. It was described by Peringuey in 1896.
