= Macrocheilus labrosus =

Scientific classification
- Kingdom: Animalia
- Phylum: Arthropoda
- Clade: Pancrustacea
- Class: Insecta
- Order: Coleoptera
- Suborder: Adephaga
- Family: Carabidae
- Genus: Macrocheilus
- Species: M. labrosus

Binomial name
- Macrocheilus labrosus (Dejean, 1831)

Species of beetle

Macrocheilus labrosus is a species of ground beetle in the subfamily Anthiinae. It was described by Pierre François Marie Auguste Dejean in 1831.
