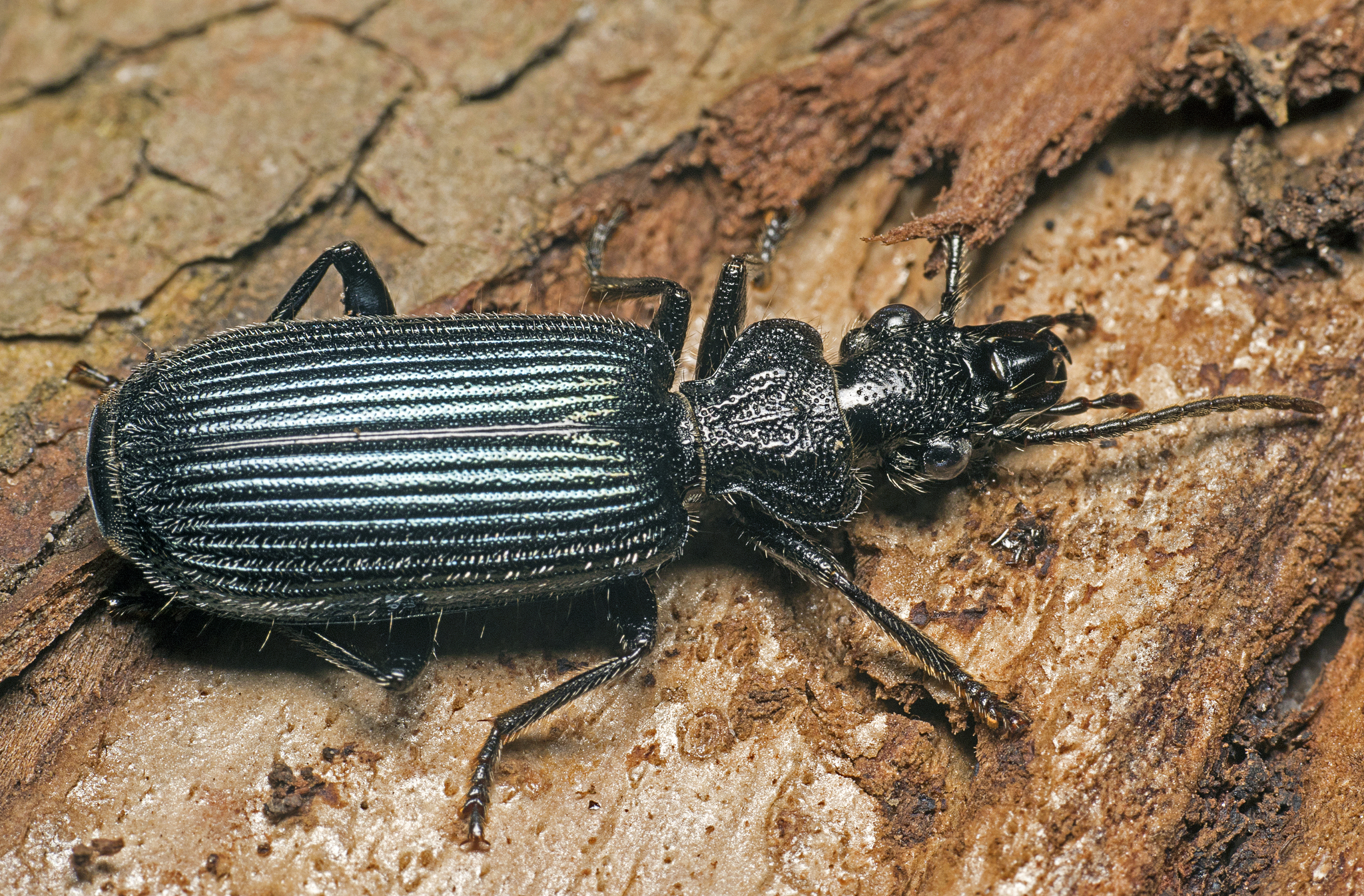
- Helluonidius, Australia

Scientific classification
- Domain: Eukaryota
- Kingdom: Animalia
- Phylum: Arthropoda
- Class: Insecta
- Order: Coleoptera
- Suborder: Adephaga
- Family: Carabidae
- Subfamily: Anthiinae
- Tribe: Helluonini
- Subtribe: Helluonina
- Genus: Helluonidius; Chaudoir, 1872

= Helluonidius =

Genus of beetles

Helluonidius is a genus of carabids in the beetle family Carabidae. There are about eight described species in Helluonidius.

== Species ==
These eight species belong to the genus Helluonidius:

- Helluonidius aterrimus (W.J.MacLeay, 1873) (Australia)
- Helluonidius chrysocomus Maindron, 1908 (Indonesia, New Guinea)
- Helluonidius cyaneus (Laporte, 1867) (Australia)
- Helluonidius cyanipennis (Hope, 1842) (Australia)
- Helluonidius laevifrons Darlington, 1968 (New Guinea)
- Helluonidius latipennis (W.J.MacLeay, 1887) (Australia)
- Helluonidius latipes Darlington, 1968 (Indonesia, New Guinea)
- Helluonidius politus Darlington, 1968 (Indonesia, New Guinea)
