= Helluosoma =

Scientific classification
- Domain: Eukaryota
- Kingdom: Animalia
- Phylum: Arthropoda
- Class: Insecta
- Order: Coleoptera
- Suborder: Adephaga
- Family: Carabidae
- Subfamily: Anthiinae
- Tribe: Helluonini
- Subtribe: Helluonina
- Genus: Helluosoma; Laporte, 1867

Genus of beetles

Helluosoma is a genus in the beetle family Carabidae. There are about seven described species in Helluosoma.

== Species ==
These seven species belong to the genus Helluosoma:

- Helluosoma atrum Laporte, 1867 (New Guinea and Australia)
- Helluosoma bisetosum Baehr, 2017 (Australia)
- Helluosoma bouchardi Baehr, 2005 (Australia)
- Helluosoma crenulicolle Baehr, 2017 (Australia)
- Helluosoma hangayi Baehr, 2005 (Australia)
- Helluosoma kalumburu Baehr, 2017 (Australia)
- Helluosoma longicolle W.J.MacLeay, 1888 (Australia)
