= Dailodontus =

Scientific classification
- Domain: Eukaryota
- Kingdom: Animalia
- Phylum: Arthropoda
- Class: Insecta
- Order: Coleoptera
- Suborder: Adephaga
- Family: Carabidae
- Subfamily: Anthiinae
- Tribe: Helluonini
- Subtribe: Omphrina
- Genus: Dailodontus; Reiche, 1843

Synonyms
- Delodontus Agassiz, 1846

Genus of beetles

Dailodontus is a genus in the ground beetle family Carabidae. There are at least two described species in Dailodontus, found in South America.

== Species ==
These two species belong to the genus Dailodontus:

- Dailodontus cayennensis (Dejean, 1826) (Venezuela, French Guiana, Brazil)
- Dailodontus clandestinus (Klug, 1834) (South America)
