= Helluopapua =

Scientific classification
- Domain: Eukaryota
- Kingdom: Animalia
- Phylum: Arthropoda
- Class: Insecta
- Order: Coleoptera
- Suborder: Adephaga
- Family: Carabidae
- Subfamily: Anthiinae
- Tribe: Helluonini
- Subtribe: Helluonina
- Genus: Helluopapua; Darlington, 1968

Genus of beetles

Helluopapua is a genus of carabids in the beetle family Carabidae. There are at least two described species in Helluopapua, found in Indonesia and New Guinea.

== Species ==
These two species belong to the genus Helluopapua:

- Helluopapua cheesmani Darlington, 1971
- Helluopapua toxopei Darlington, 1968
