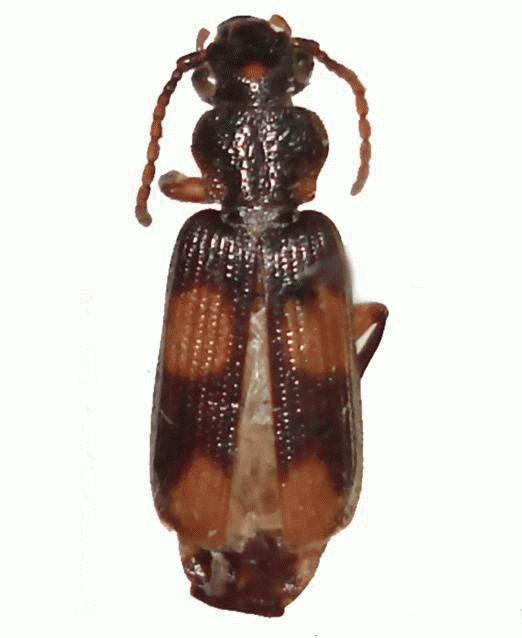

Scientific classification
- Kingdom: Animalia
- Phylum: Arthropoda
- Clade: Pancrustacea
- Class: Insecta
- Order: Coleoptera
- Suborder: Adephaga
- Family: Carabidae
- Genus: Macrocheilus
- Species: M. nigrotibialis

Binomial name
- Macrocheilus nigrotibialis Heller, 1900

= Macrocheilus nigrotibialis =

Species of beetle

Macrocheilus nigrotibialis is a species of ground beetle in the subfamily Anthiinae. It was described by Heller in the year 1900.
