= Epimicodema =

Scientific classification
- Kingdom: Animalia
- Phylum: Arthropoda
- Class: Insecta
- Order: Coleoptera
- Suborder: Adephaga
- Family: Carabidae
- Subfamily: Anthiinae
- Tribe: Helluonini
- Subtribe: Helluonina
- Genus: Epimicodema; Sloane, 1914
- Species: E. mastersii

Binomial name
- Epimicodema mastersii (W.J.MacLeay, 1871)

Genus of beetles

Epimicodema is a genus in the ground beetle family Carabidae. This genus has a single species, Epimicodema mastersii. It is found in Australia.
