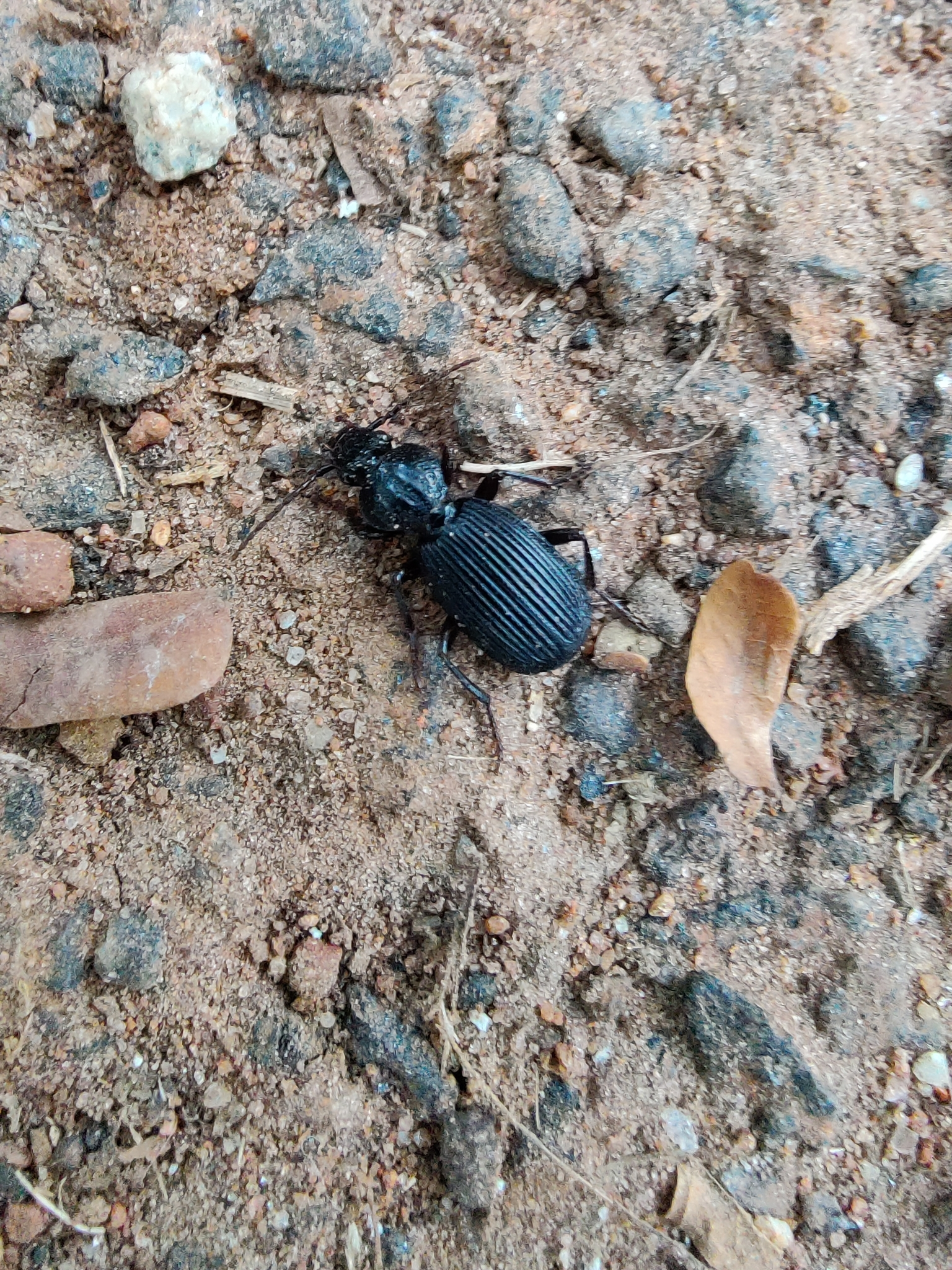
- Omphra , India

Scientific classification
- Kingdom: Animalia
- Phylum: Arthropoda
- Class: Insecta
- Order: Coleoptera
- Suborder: Adephaga
- Family: Carabidae
- Subfamily: Anthiinae
- Tribe: Helluonini
- Subtribe: Omphrina
- Genus: Omphra; Dejean, 1825

= Omphra =

Genus of beetles

Omphra is a genus in the beetle family Carabidae. There are about seven described species in Omphra.

== Species ==
These seven species belong to the genus Omphra:

- Omphra atrata (Klug, 1834) (India)
- Omphra complanata Reiche, 1843 (Pakistan and India)
- Omphra drumonti Shiju; Sabu & Zhao, 2012 (India)
- Omphra hirta (Fabricius, 1801) (Sri Lanka, India, and Malaysia)
- Omphra pilosa (Klug, 1834) (Sri Lanka and India)
- Omphra rotundicollis Chaudoir, 1872 (India)
- Omphra rufipes (Klug, 1834) (Sri Lanka)
