= Macrocheilus biguttatus =

Scientific classification
- Kingdom: Animalia
- Phylum: Arthropoda
- Clade: Pancrustacea
- Class: Insecta
- Order: Coleoptera
- Suborder: Adephaga
- Family: Carabidae
- Genus: Macrocheilus
- Species: M. biguttatus

Binomial name
- Macrocheilus biguttatus Gory, 1832

Species of beetle

Macrocheilus biguttatus is a species of ground beetle in the subfamily Anthiinae. It was described by Gory in 1832.
