= Macrocheilus cruciatus =

Scientific classification
- Kingdom: Animalia
- Phylum: Arthropoda
- Clade: Pancrustacea
- Class: Insecta
- Order: Coleoptera
- Suborder: Adephaga
- Family: Carabidae
- Genus: Macrocheilus
- Species: M. cruciatus

Binomial name
- Macrocheilus cruciatus (Marc, 1840)

Species of beetle

Macrocheilus cruciatus is a species of ground beetle in the subfamily Anthiinae. It was described by Marc in 1840.
