= Macrocheilus dorsiger =

Scientific classification
- Kingdom: Animalia
- Phylum: Arthropoda
- Clade: Pancrustacea
- Class: Insecta
- Order: Coleoptera
- Suborder: Adephaga
- Family: Carabidae
- Genus: Macrocheilus
- Species: M. dorsiger

Binomial name
- Macrocheilus dorsiger (Chaudoir, 1876)

Species of beetle

Macrocheilus dorsiger is a species of ground beetle in the subfamily Anthiinae. It was described by Maximilien Chaudoir in 1876.
