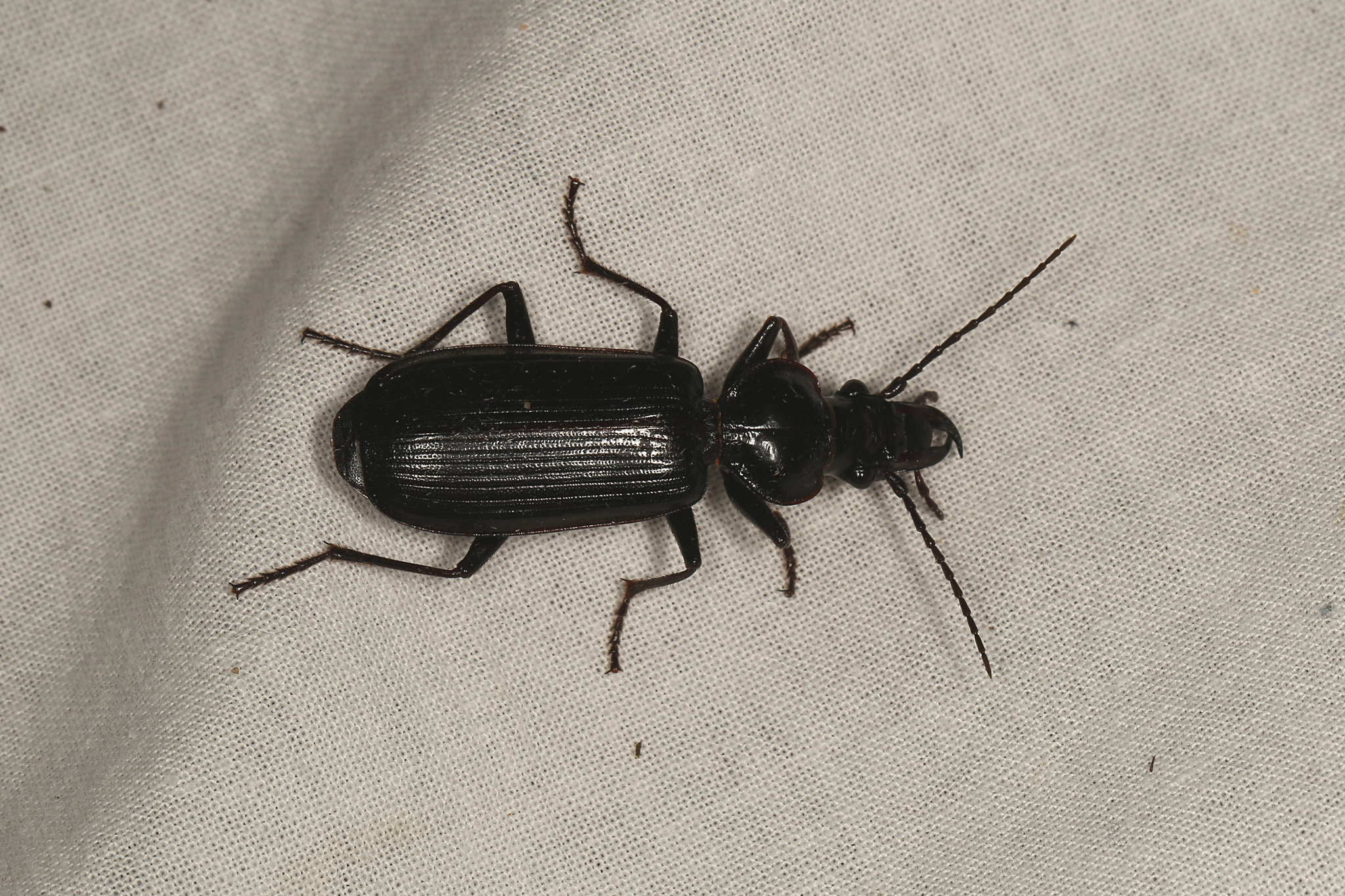
- Gigadema, Australia

Scientific classification
- Kingdom: Animalia
- Phylum: Arthropoda
- Class: Insecta
- Order: Coleoptera
- Suborder: Adephaga
- Family: Carabidae
- Subfamily: Anthiinae
- Tribe: Helluonini
- Subtribe: Helluonina
- Genus: Gigadema; J.Thomson, 1859

Synonyms
- Gigadaema J.Thomson, 1859; Penichrodema Gestro, 1875

= Gigadema =

Genus of beetles

Gigadema is a genus in the ground beetle family Carabidae. There are about 13 described species in Gigadema, found in Australia and New Guinea.

== Species ==
These 13 species belong to the genus Gigadema:

- Gigadema biordinatum Sloane, 1914 (Australia)
- Gigadema bostockii Laporte, 1867 (Australia)
- Gigadema dux Blackburn, 1901 (Australia)
- Gigadema froggatti W.J.MacLeay, 1888 (Australia)
- Gigadema grande W.J.MacLeay, 1864 (Australia)
- Gigadema gulare Sloane, 1914 (Australia)
- Gigadema longipenne (Germar, 1848) (Australia)
- Gigadema mandibulare Blackburn, 1892 (Australia)
- Gigadema maxillare Sloane, 1914 (New Guinea and Australia)
- Gigadema nocte (Newman, 1842) (Australia)
- Gigadema obscurum Sloane, 1914 (Australia)
- Gigadema rugaticolle Blackburn, 1901 (Australia)
- Gigadema sulcatum (W.J.MacLeay, 1864) (Australia)
