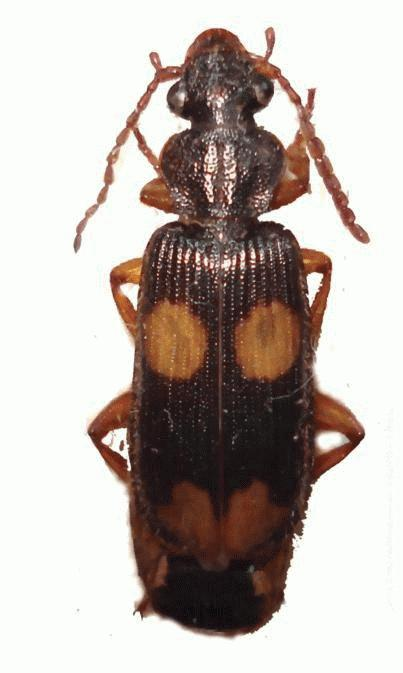

Scientific classification
- Kingdom: Animalia
- Phylum: Arthropoda
- Clade: Pancrustacea
- Class: Insecta
- Order: Coleoptera
- Suborder: Adephaga
- Family: Carabidae
- Genus: Macrocheilus
- Species: M. bensoni

Binomial name
- Macrocheilus bensoni Hope, 1838

= Macrocheilus bensoni =

Species of beetle

Macrocheilus bensoni is a species of ground beetle in the subfamily Anthiinae. It was described by Frederick William Hope in 1838.
