= Macrocheilus moraisi =

Scientific classification
- Kingdom: Animalia
- Phylum: Arthropoda
- Clade: Pancrustacea
- Class: Insecta
- Order: Coleoptera
- Suborder: Adephaga
- Family: Carabidae
- Genus: Macrocheilus
- Species: M. moraisi

Binomial name
- Macrocheilus moraisi A. Serrano, 2000

Species of beetle

Macrocheilus moraisi is a species of ground beetle in the subfamily Anthiinae. It was described by A. Serrano in 2000.
