= Macrocheilus vanharteni =

Scientific classification
- Kingdom: Animalia
- Phylum: Arthropoda
- Clade: Pancrustacea
- Class: Insecta
- Order: Coleoptera
- Suborder: Adephaga
- Family: Carabidae
- Genus: Macrocheilus
- Species: M. vanharteni

Binomial name
- Macrocheilus vanharteni Felix & Muilwijk, 2007

Species of beetle

Macrocheilus vanharteni is a species of ground beetle in the subfamily Anthiinae. It was described by Felix & Muilwijk in 2007.
