= Macrocheilus bimaculatus =

Scientific classification
- Kingdom: Animalia
- Phylum: Arthropoda
- Clade: Pancrustacea
- Class: Insecta
- Order: Coleoptera
- Suborder: Adephaga
- Family: Carabidae
- Genus: Macrocheilus
- Species: M. bimaculatus

Binomial name
- Macrocheilus bimaculatus (Dejean, 1831)

Species of beetle

Macrocheilus bimaculatus is a species of ground beetle in the subfamily Anthiinae. It was described by Pierre François Marie Auguste Dejean in 1831.
