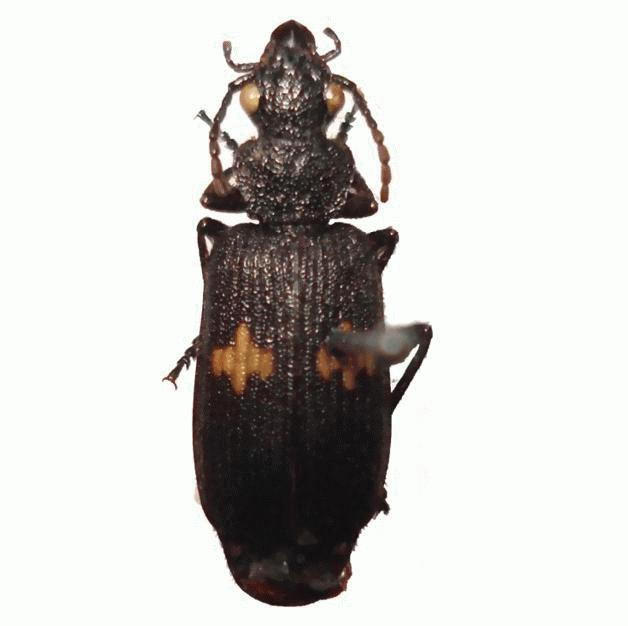

Scientific classification
- Kingdom: Animalia
- Phylum: Arthropoda
- Clade: Pancrustacea
- Class: Insecta
- Order: Coleoptera
- Suborder: Adephaga
- Family: Carabidae
- Genus: Macrocheilus
- Species: M. asteriscus

Binomial name
- Macrocheilus asteriscus (White, 1844)

= Macrocheilus asteriscus =

Species of beetle

Macrocheilus asteriscus is a species of ground beetle in the subfamily Anthiinae. It was described by White in 1844.
