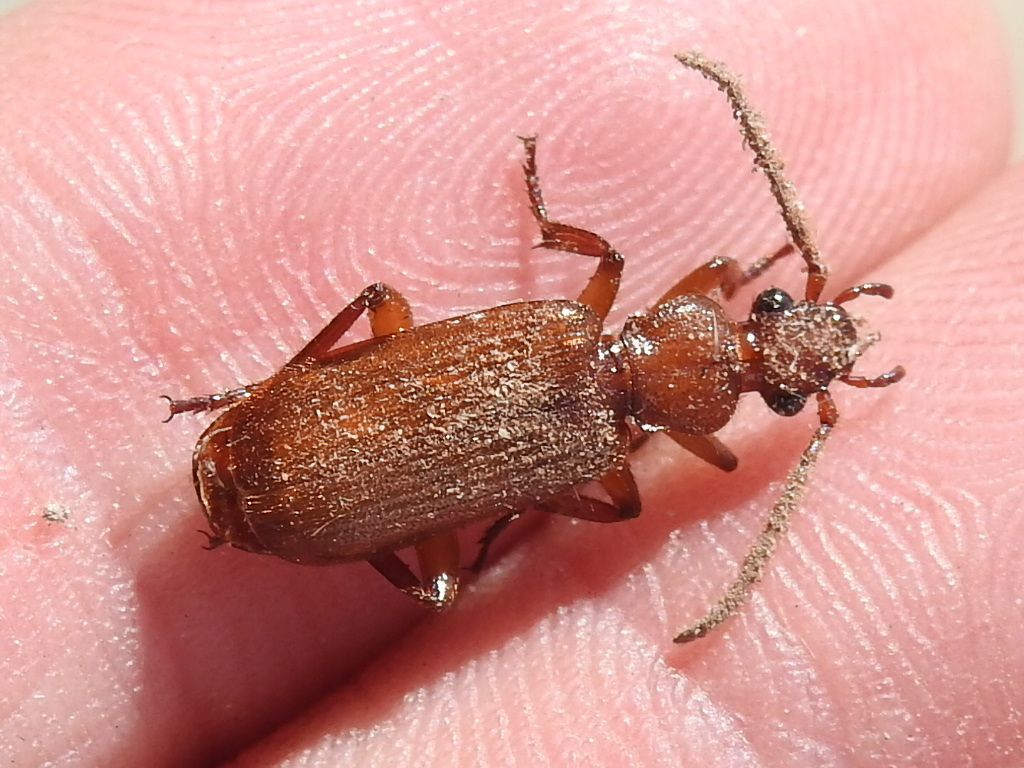
- Helluomorphoides, Texas

Scientific classification
- Domain: Eukaryota
- Kingdom: Animalia
- Phylum: Arthropoda
- Class: Insecta
- Order: Coleoptera
- Suborder: Adephaga
- Family: Carabidae
- Subfamily: Anthiinae
- Tribe: Helluonini
- Genus: Helluomorphoides; Ball, 1951

= Helluomorphoides =

Genus of beetles

Helluomorphoides is a genus in the beetle family Carabidae. There are more than 20 described species in Helluomorphoides.

== Species ==
These 23 species belong to the genus Helluomorphoides:

- Helluomorphoides balli Reichardt, 1974 (Mexico)
- Helluomorphoides brunneus (Putzeys, 1845) (Brazil)
- Helluomorphoides clairvillei (Dejean, 1831) (United States)
- Helluomorphoides diana Reichardt, 1974 (Peru)
- Helluomorphoides femoratus (Dejean, 1831) (Bolivia, Argentina, and Brazil)
- Helluomorphoides ferrugineus (LeConte, 1853) (United States and Mexico)
- Helluomorphoides gigantops Reichardt, 1974 (Brazil)
- Helluomorphoides glabratus (Bates, 1871) (Bolivia, Colombia, French Guiana, Peru, and Brazil)
- Helluomorphoides io Reichardt, 1974 (Brazil)
- Helluomorphoides juno Reichardt, 1974 (Brazil)
- Helluomorphoides latitarsis (Casey, 1913) (United States and Mexico)
- Helluomorphoides longicollis (Bates, 1883) (Guatemala)
- Helluomorphoides mexicanus (Chaudoir, 1872) (Mexico)
- Helluomorphoides nigerrimus (Klug, 1834) (Argentina and Brazil)
- Helluomorphoides nigripennis (Dejean, 1831) (United States)
- Helluomorphoides oculeus (Bates, 1871) (Brazil)
- Helluomorphoides papago (Casey, 1913) (United States and Mexico)
- Helluomorphoides praeustus (Dejean, 1825) (United States)
- Helluomorphoides ritae Reichardt, 1974 (Brazil)
- Helluomorphoides rubricollis (Schaum, 1863) (Argentina, Uruguay, and Brazil)
- Helluomorphoides squiresi (Chaudoir, 1872) (Bolivia and Brazil)
- Helluomorphoides texanus (LeConte, 1853) (United States and Mexico)
- Helluomorphoides unicolor (Brullé, 1838) (Bolivia, Ecuador, Peru, and Brazil)
