= Macrocheilus scapularis =

Scientific classification
- Kingdom: Animalia
- Phylum: Arthropoda
- Clade: Pancrustacea
- Class: Insecta
- Order: Coleoptera
- Suborder: Adephaga
- Family: Carabidae
- Genus: Macrocheilus
- Species: M. scapularis

Binomial name
- Macrocheilus scapularis Reiche, 1843

Species of beetle

Macrocheilus scapularis is a species of ground beetle in the subfamily Anthiinae. It was described by Reiche in 1843.
