= Macrocheilus crampeli =

Scientific classification
- Kingdom: Animalia
- Phylum: Arthropoda
- Clade: Pancrustacea
- Class: Insecta
- Order: Coleoptera
- Suborder: Adephaga
- Family: Carabidae
- Genus: Macrocheilus
- Species: M. crampeli

Binomial name
- Macrocheilus crampeli Alluaud, 1916

Species of beetle

Macrocheilus crampeli is a species of ground beetle in the subfamily Anthiinae. It was described by Alluaud in 1916.
