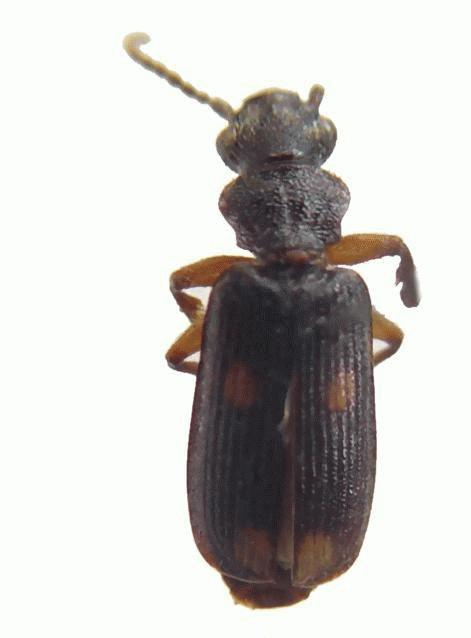

Scientific classification
- Kingdom: Animalia
- Phylum: Arthropoda
- Clade: Pancrustacea
- Class: Insecta
- Order: Coleoptera
- Suborder: Adephaga
- Family: Carabidae
- Genus: Macrocheilus
- Species: M. parvimaculatus

Binomial name
- Macrocheilus parvimaculatus Zhao & Tian, 2010

= Macrocheilus parvimaculatus =

Species of beetle

Macrocheilus parvimaculatus is a species of ground beetle in the subfamily Anthiinae. It was described by Zhao & Tian in 2010.
