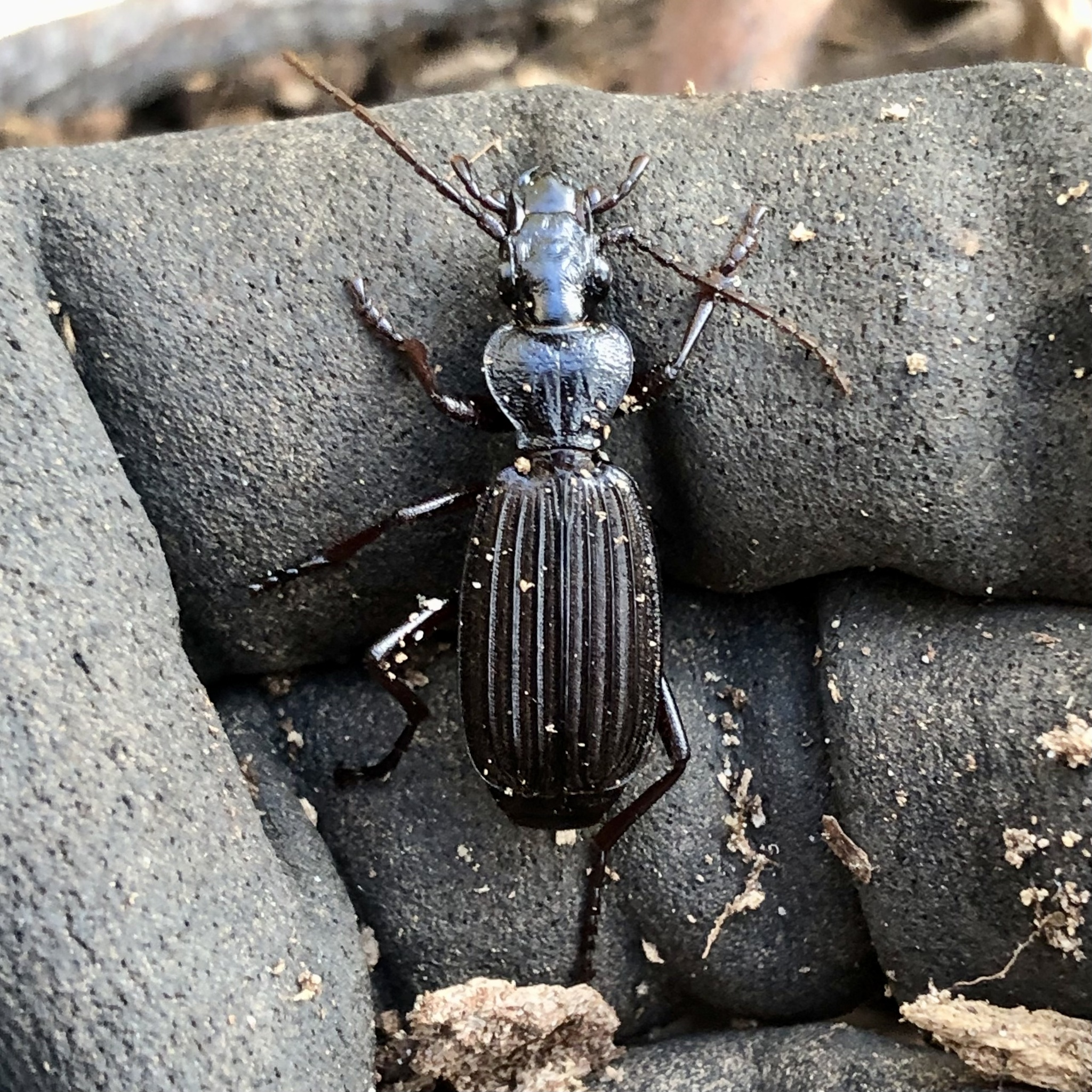
- Helluo, Australia

Scientific classification
- Domain: Eukaryota
- Kingdom: Animalia
- Phylum: Arthropoda
- Class: Insecta
- Order: Coleoptera
- Suborder: Adephaga
- Family: Carabidae
- Subfamily: Anthiinae
- Tribe: Helluonini
- Subtribe: Helluonina
- Genus: Helluo; Bonelli, 1813

Synonyms
- Hellulo Cuvier, 1817

= Helluo =

Genus of beetles

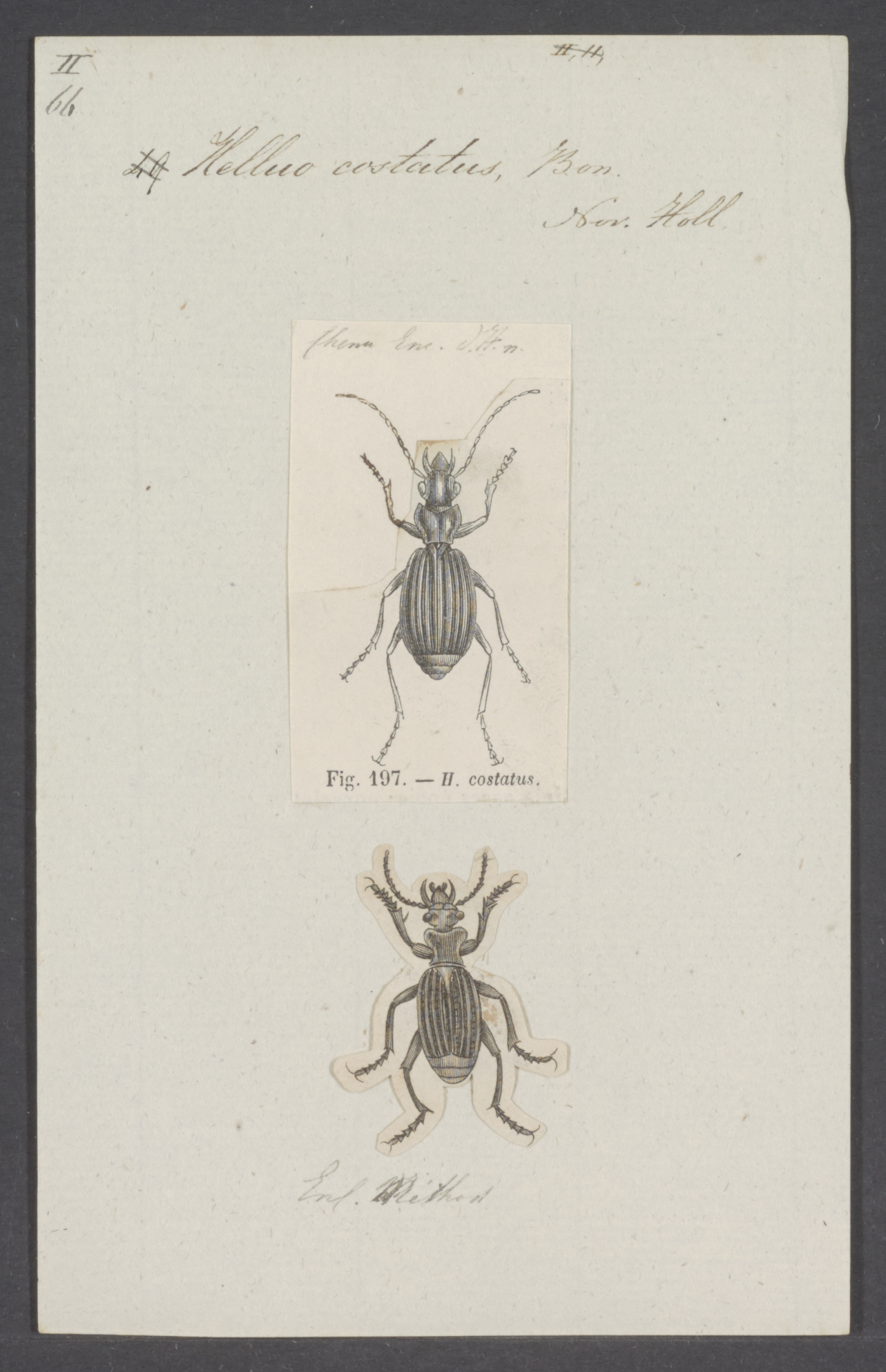
Helluo Iconographical print. Height: 16,81 cm. Width: 10,86 cm.

Helluo is a genus of carabids in the beetle family Carabidae. There are at least two described species in Helluo, found in Australia.

== Species ==
These two species belong to the genus Helluo:

- Helluo costatus Bonelli, 1813
- Helluo insignis Sloane, 1890
