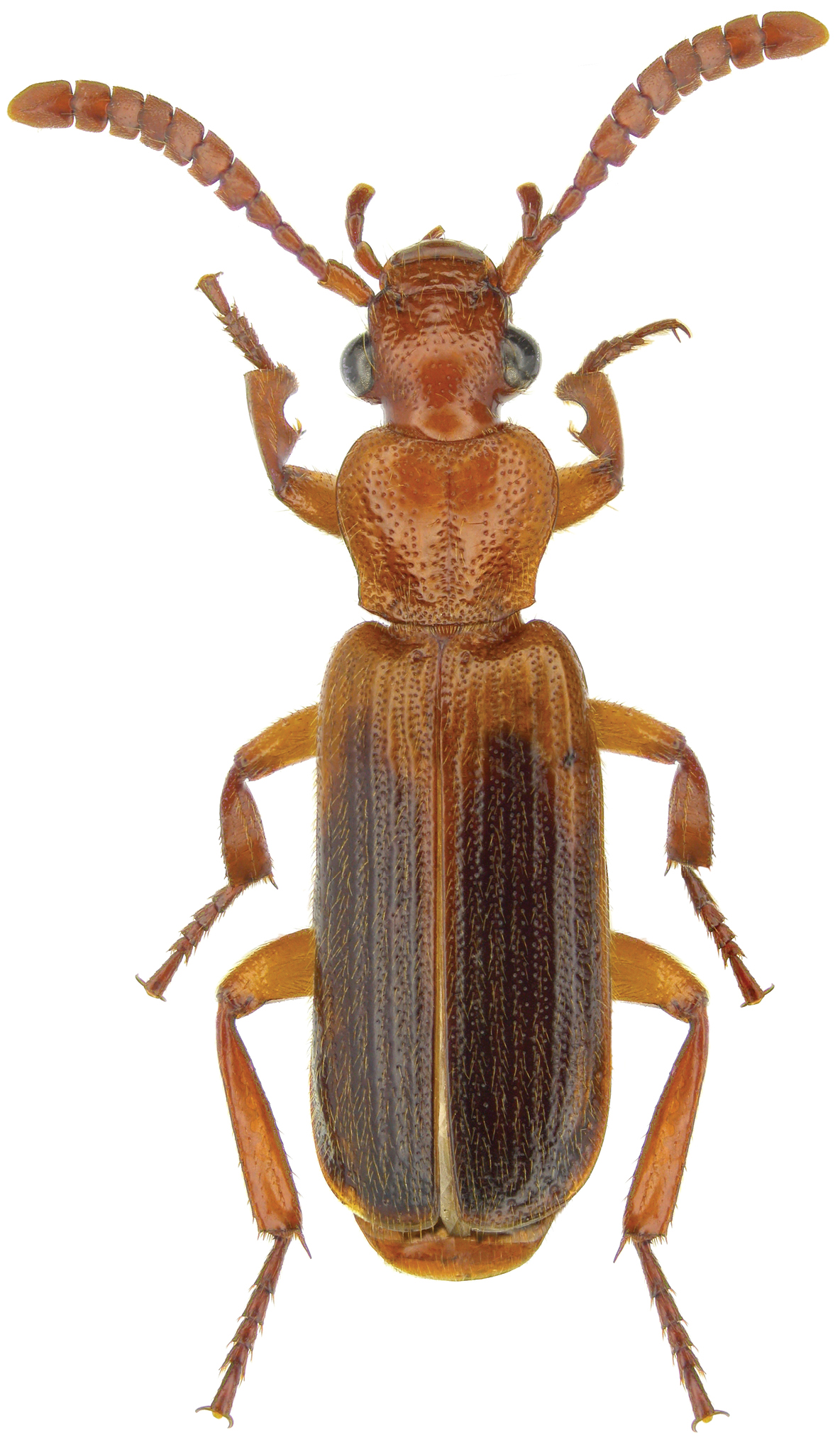

Scientific classification
- Kingdom: Animalia
- Phylum: Arthropoda
- Clade: Pancrustacea
- Class: Insecta
- Order: Coleoptera
- Suborder: Adephaga
- Family: Carabidae
- Subfamily: Anthiinae
- Tribe: Helluonini
- Subtribe: Omphrina
- Genus: Helluomorpha; Laporte, 1834

= Helluomorpha =

Genus of beetles

Helluomorpha is a genus in the beetle family Carabidae. There are about five described species in Helluomorpha.

== Species ==
These five species belong to the genus Helluomorpha:

- Helluomorpha araujoi Reichardt, 1974 (Bolivia, Argentina, Paraguay, and Brazil)
- Helluomorpha eulinae Reichardt, 1974 (Paraguay and Brazil)
- Helluomorpha heros (Gory, 1833) (Paraguay and Brazil)
- Helluomorpha macroptera Chaudoir, 1850 (Paraguay, Ecuador, Peru, and Brazil)
- † Helluomorpha protogaea Giebel, 1862
