= Macrocheilus dorsalis =

Scientific classification
- Kingdom: Animalia
- Phylum: Arthropoda
- Clade: Pancrustacea
- Class: Insecta
- Order: Coleoptera
- Suborder: Adephaga
- Family: Carabidae
- Genus: Macrocheilus
- Species: M. dorsalis

Binomial name
- Macrocheilus dorsalis Klug, 1834

Species of beetle

Macrocheilus dorsalis is a species of ground beetle in the subfamily Anthiinae. It was described by Johann Christoph Friedrich Klug in 1834.
