= Helluodema =

Scientific classification
- Domain: Eukaryota
- Kingdom: Animalia
- Phylum: Arthropoda
- Class: Insecta
- Order: Coleoptera
- Suborder: Adephaga
- Family: Carabidae
- Subfamily: Anthiinae
- Tribe: Helluonini
- Subtribe: Helluonina
- Genus: Helluodema; Laporte, 1867

Synonyms
- Simoglossus Chaudoir, 1872

Genus of beetles

Helluodema is a genus of carabids in the beetle family Carabidae. There are at least two described species in Helluodema.

== Species ==
These two species belong to the genus Helluodema:

- Helluodema brunneum Sloane, 1917 (Australia)
- Helluodema unicolor (Hope, 1842) (Indonesia, New Guinea, Australia)
