= Macrocheilus saulcyi =

Scientific classification
- Kingdom: Animalia
- Phylum: Arthropoda
- Clade: Pancrustacea
- Class: Insecta
- Order: Coleoptera
- Suborder: Adephaga
- Family: Carabidae
- Genus: Macrocheilus
- Species: M. saulcyi

Binomial name
- Macrocheilus saulcyi Chevrolat, 1854

Species of beetle

Macrocheilus saulcyi is a species of ground beetle in the subfamily Anthiinae. It was described by Louis Alexandre Auguste Chevrolat in 1854.
