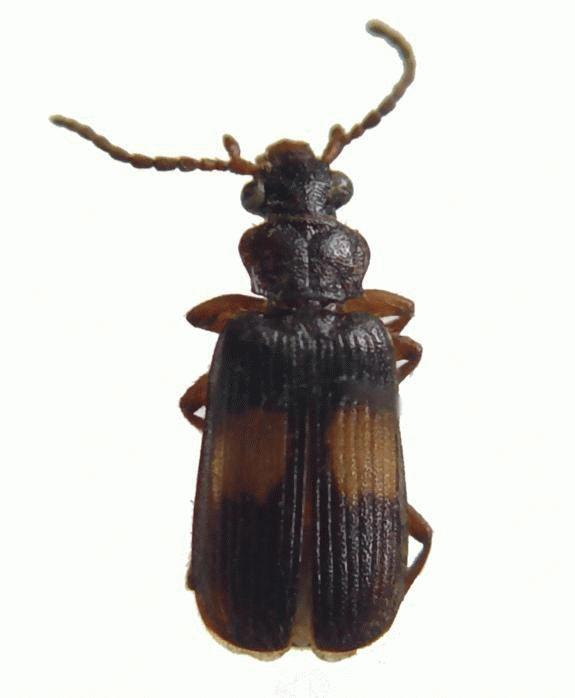

Scientific classification
- Kingdom: Animalia
- Phylum: Arthropoda
- Clade: Pancrustacea
- Class: Insecta
- Order: Coleoptera
- Suborder: Adephaga
- Family: Carabidae
- Genus: Macrocheilus
- Species: M. solidipalpis

Binomial name
- Macrocheilus solidipalpis Zhao & Tian, 2010

= Macrocheilus solidipalpis =

Species of beetle

Macrocheilus solidipalpis is a species of ground beetle in the subfamily Anthiinae. It was described by Zhao & Tian in 2010.
