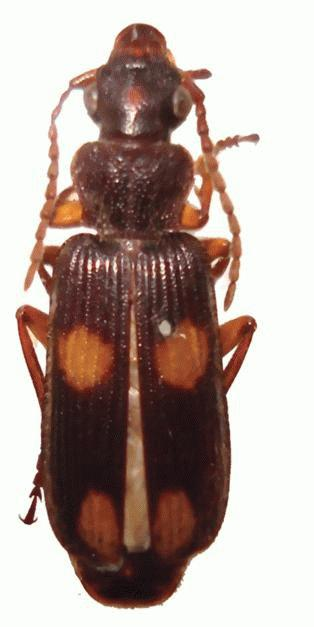

Scientific classification
- Kingdom: Animalia
- Phylum: Arthropoda
- Clade: Pancrustacea
- Class: Insecta
- Order: Coleoptera
- Suborder: Adephaga
- Family: Carabidae
- Genus: Macrocheilus
- Species: M. tripustulatus

Binomial name
- Macrocheilus tripustulatus (Dejean, 1825)

Synonyms
- Helluo tripustulatus

= Macrocheilus tripustulatus =

Species of beetle

Macrocheilus tripustulatus is a species of ground beetle in the subfamily Anthiinae. It was described by Dejean in 1825.
