= Erephognathus =

Scientific classification
- Domain: Eukaryota
- Kingdom: Animalia
- Phylum: Arthropoda
- Class: Insecta
- Order: Coleoptera
- Suborder: Adephaga
- Family: Carabidae
- Subfamily: Anthiinae
- Tribe: Helluonini
- Subtribe: Omphrina
- Genus: Erephognathus; Alluaud, 1932

Genus of beetles

Erephognathus is a genus in the beetle family Carabidae. There are at least three described species in Erephognathus, found in Madagascar.

== Species ==
These three species belong to the genus Erephognathus:

- Erephognathus coerulescens (Fairmaire, 1903)
- Erephognathus margarithrix Alluaud, 1936
- Erephognathus ranomafanae Kavanaugh & Rainio, 2016
