= Colfax stevensi =

Scientific classification
- Kingdom: Animalia
- Phylum: Arthropoda
- Class: Insecta
- Order: Coleoptera
- Suborder: Adephaga
- Family: Carabidae
- Subfamily: Anthiinae
- Tribe: Helluonini
- Subtribe: Omphrina
- Genus: Colfax; Andrewes, 1920
- Species: C. stevensi

Binomial name
- Colfax stevensi Andrewes, 1920

Genus of beetle

Colfax is a genus of in the beetle family Carabidae. This genus has a single species, Colfax stevensi, found in Indomalaya.
