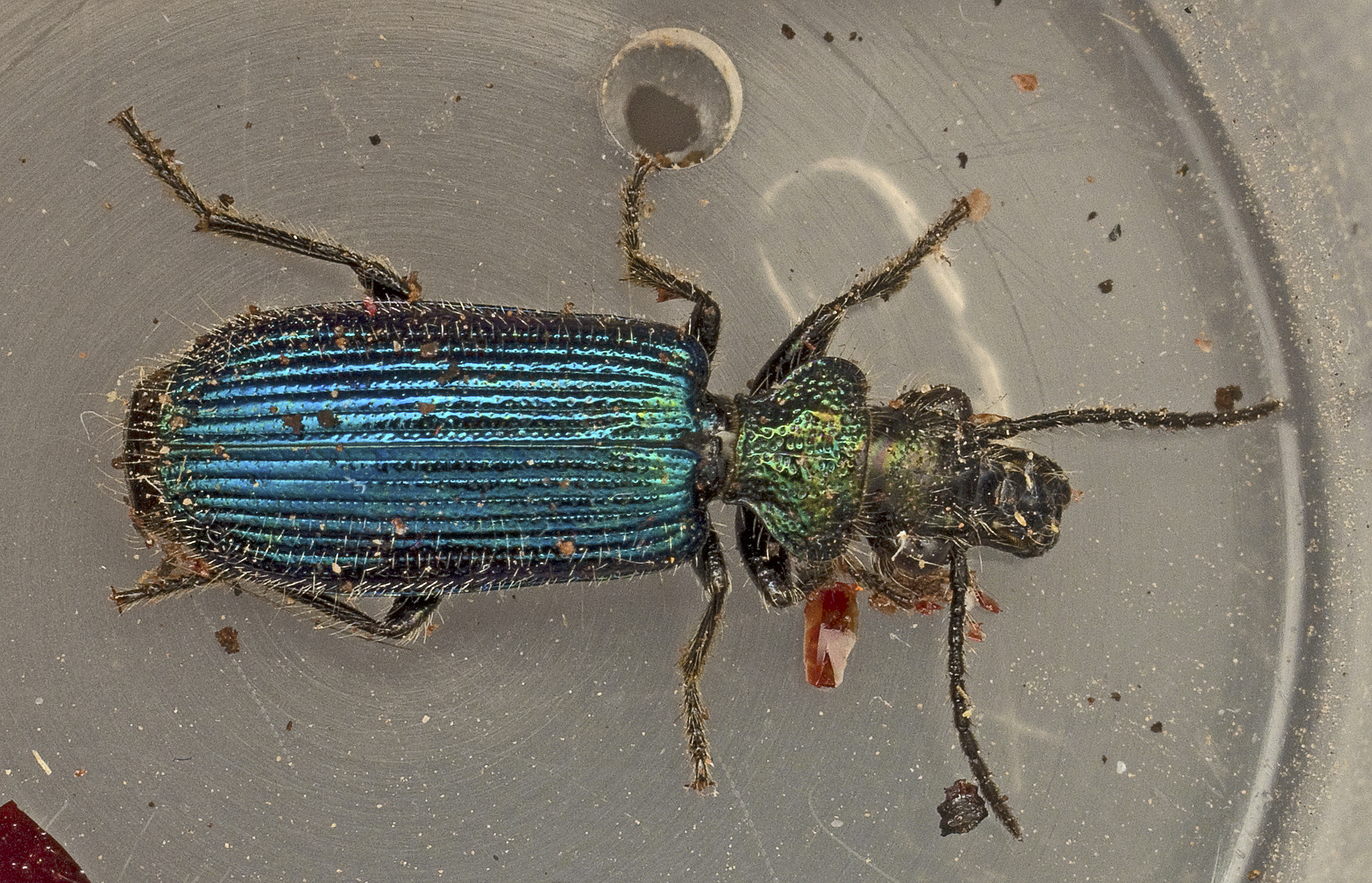
- Dicranoglossus resplendens, Australia

Scientific classification
- Domain: Eukaryota
- Kingdom: Animalia
- Phylum: Arthropoda
- Class: Insecta
- Order: Coleoptera
- Suborder: Adephaga
- Family: Carabidae
- Subfamily: Anthiinae
- Tribe: Helluonini
- Subtribe: Helluonina
- Genus: Dicranoglossus; Chaudoir, 1872
- Species: D. resplendens

Binomial name
- Dicranoglossus resplendens (Laporte, 1867)

= Dicranoglossus =

Genus of beetles

Dicranoglossus is a genus in the ground beetle family Carabidae. This genus has a single species, Dicranoglossus resplendens, found in Australia.
