= Macrocheilus biplagiatus =

Scientific classification
- Kingdom: Animalia
- Phylum: Arthropoda
- Clade: Pancrustacea
- Class: Insecta
- Order: Coleoptera
- Suborder: Adephaga
- Family: Carabidae
- Genus: Macrocheilus
- Species: M. biplagiatus

Binomial name
- Macrocheilus biplagiatus (Boheman, 1848)

Species of beetle

Macrocheilus biplagiatus is a species of ground beetle in the subfamily Anthiinae. It was described by Boheman in 1848.
