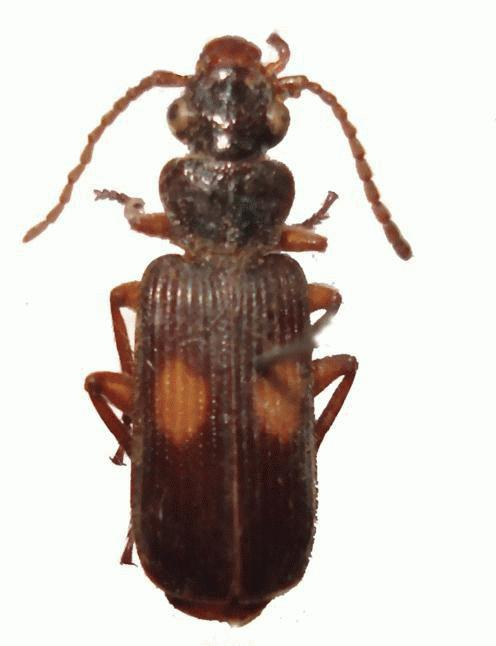

Scientific classification
- Kingdom: Animalia
- Phylum: Arthropoda
- Clade: Pancrustacea
- Class: Insecta
- Order: Coleoptera
- Suborder: Adephaga
- Family: Carabidae
- Genus: Macrocheilus
- Species: M. binotatus

Binomial name
- Macrocheilus binotatus Andrewes, 1931

= Macrocheilus binotatus =

Species of beetle

Macrocheilus binotatus is a species of ground beetle in the subfamily Anthiinae. It was described by Andrewes in 1931.
