= Helluobrochus =

Scientific classification
- Domain: Eukaryota
- Kingdom: Animalia
- Phylum: Arthropoda
- Class: Insecta
- Order: Coleoptera
- Suborder: Adephaga
- Family: Carabidae
- Subfamily: Anthiinae
- Tribe: Helluonini
- Subtribe: Omphrina
- Genus: Helluobrochus; Reichardt, 1974

Genus of beetles

Helluobrochus is a genus of carabids in the beetle family Carabidae. There are more than 20 described species in Helluobrochus, found in Central and South America.

== Species ==
These 26 species belong to the genus Helluobrochus:

- Helluobrochus anthracinus (Klug, 1834) (Brazil)
- Helluobrochus ares Reichardt, 1974 (Brazil)
- Helluobrochus argus Reichardt, 1974 (Brazil)
- Helluobrochus bacchus (Reichardt, 1972) (Argentina, Brazil)
- Helluobrochus bechynei Reichardt, 1974 (Brazil)
- Helluobrochus birai Reichardt, 1974 (Brazil)
- Helluobrochus brasiliensis (Dejean, 1825) (Argentina, Brazil)
- Helluobrochus brevicollis (Dejean, 1831) (French Guiana, Peru, Brazil)
- Helluobrochus bucki Reichardt, 1974 (Argentina, Paraguay, Brazil)
- Helluobrochus capixaba Reichardt, 1974 (Brazil)
- Helluobrochus collaris (Chaudoir, 1877) (Brazil)
- Helluobrochus cribratus (Reiche, 1843) (Central and South America)
- Helluobrochus cribricollis (Chaudoir, 1872) (Argentina, Paraguay, Brazil)
- Helluobrochus darlingtoni Reichardt, 1974 (Paraguay, French Guiana, Brazil)
- Helluobrochus horqueta Reichardt, 1974 (Paraguay)
- Helluobrochus inconspicuus (Chaudoir, 1848) (Argentina, Brazil)
- Helluobrochus lacordairei (Dejean, 1831) (Bolivia, Argentina)
- Helluobrochus linearis (Bates, 1871) (Brazil)
- Helluobrochus luctuosus (Chaudoir, 1872) (Bolivia, Brazil)
- Helluobrochus negrei Reichardt, 1974 (Argentina)
- Helluobrochus oculatus Reichardt, 1974 (Brazil)
- Helluobrochus oopselaphus Reichardt, 1974 (Brazil)
- Helluobrochus petrus Reichardt, 1974 (Brazil)
- Helluobrochus pilipalpis Reichardt, 1974 (Bolivia)
- Helluobrochus sanguinolentus (Klug, 1834) (Paraguay, Brazil)
- Helluobrochus subrostratus (Bates, 1871) (Argentina, Paraguay, Ecuador, Peru, Brazil)
