= Macrocheilus macromaculatus =

Scientific classification
- Kingdom: Animalia
- Phylum: Arthropoda
- Clade: Pancrustacea
- Class: Insecta
- Order: Coleoptera
- Suborder: Adephaga
- Family: Carabidae
- Genus: Macrocheilus
- Species: M. macromaculatus

Binomial name
- Macrocheilus macromaculatus Louwerens, 1949

Species of beetle

Macrocheilus macromaculatus is a species of ground beetle in the subfamily Anthiinae. It was described by Dalton Clary in 1949.
