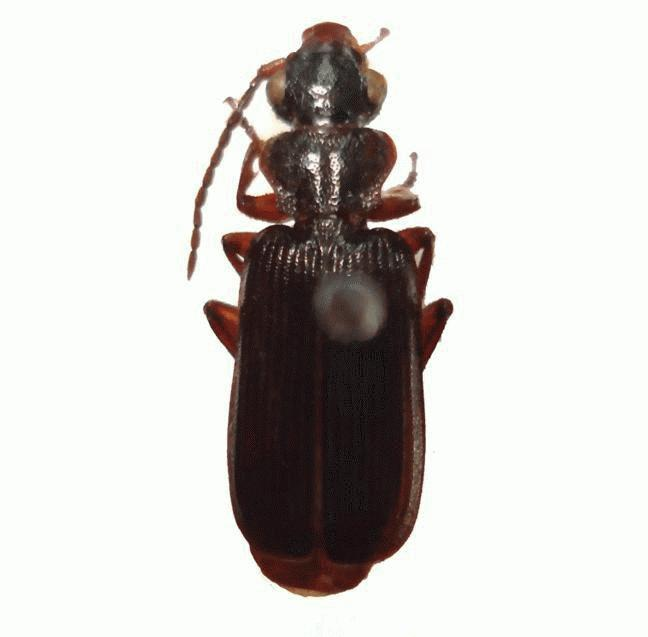

Scientific classification
- Kingdom: Animalia
- Phylum: Arthropoda
- Clade: Pancrustacea
- Class: Insecta
- Order: Coleoptera
- Suborder: Adephaga
- Family: Carabidae
- Genus: Macrocheilus
- Species: M. impictus

Binomial name
- Macrocheilus impictus (Wiedemann, 1823)

= Macrocheilus impictus =

Species of beetle

Macrocheilus impictus is a species of ground beetle in the subfamily Anthiinae. It was described by Wiedemann in 1823.
