= Gonogenia =

Scientific classification
- Domain: Eukaryota
- Kingdom: Animalia
- Phylum: Arthropoda
- Class: Insecta
- Order: Coleoptera
- Suborder: Adephaga
- Family: Carabidae
- Subfamily: Anthiinae
- Tribe: Anthiini
- Genus: Gonogenia; Chaudoir, 1844

Synonyms
- Microlestia Chaudoir, 1850

Genus of beetles

Gonogenia is a genus of carabids in the beetle family Carabidae. There are about seven described species in Gonogenia, found in Africa.

== Species ==
These seven species belong to the genus Gonogenia:

- Gonogenia atrata (Boheman, 1848) (Namibia, South Africa)
- Gonogenia endroedyi Basilewsky, 1980 (South Africa)
- Gonogenia immerita (Boheman, 1860) (Angola, Namibia, South Africa)
- Gonogenia oxygona (Chaudoir, 1844) (South Africa)
- Gonogenia rugosopunctata (Thunberg, 1806) (South Africa)
- Gonogenia spinipennis (Chaudoir, 1850) (South Africa)
- Gonogenia tabida (Fabricius, 1775) (South Africa)
