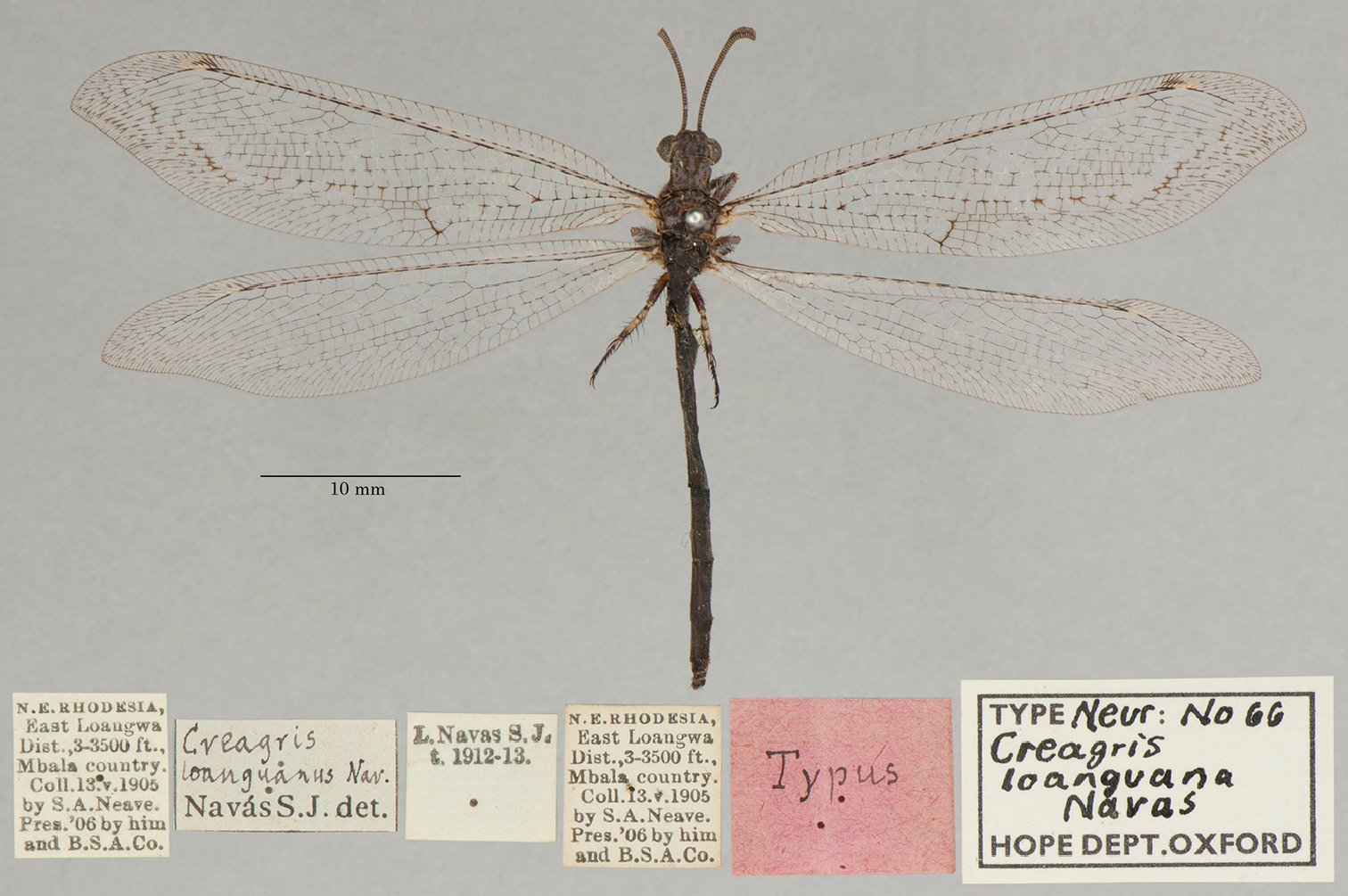

Scientific classification
- Kingdom: Animalia
- Phylum: Arthropoda
- Clade: Pancrustacea
- Class: Insecta
- Order: Coleoptera
- Suborder: Adephaga
- Family: Carabidae
- Tribe: Helluonini
- Genus: Creagris; Nietner, 1857

= Creagris =

Genus of beetles

Creagris is a genus of beetles in the family Carabidae, containing the following species:

- Creagris bigemmis Andrewes, 1931
- Creagris binoculus Bates, 1892
- Creagris bisignata Landin, 1955
- Creagris distacta (Wiedemann, 1823)
- Creagris hamaticollis Bates, 1892
- Creagris labrosa Nietner, 1857
- Creagris lineola Andrewes, 1926
- Creagris rubrothorax Louwerens, 1949
- Creagris wilsonii (Castelnau, 1867)
