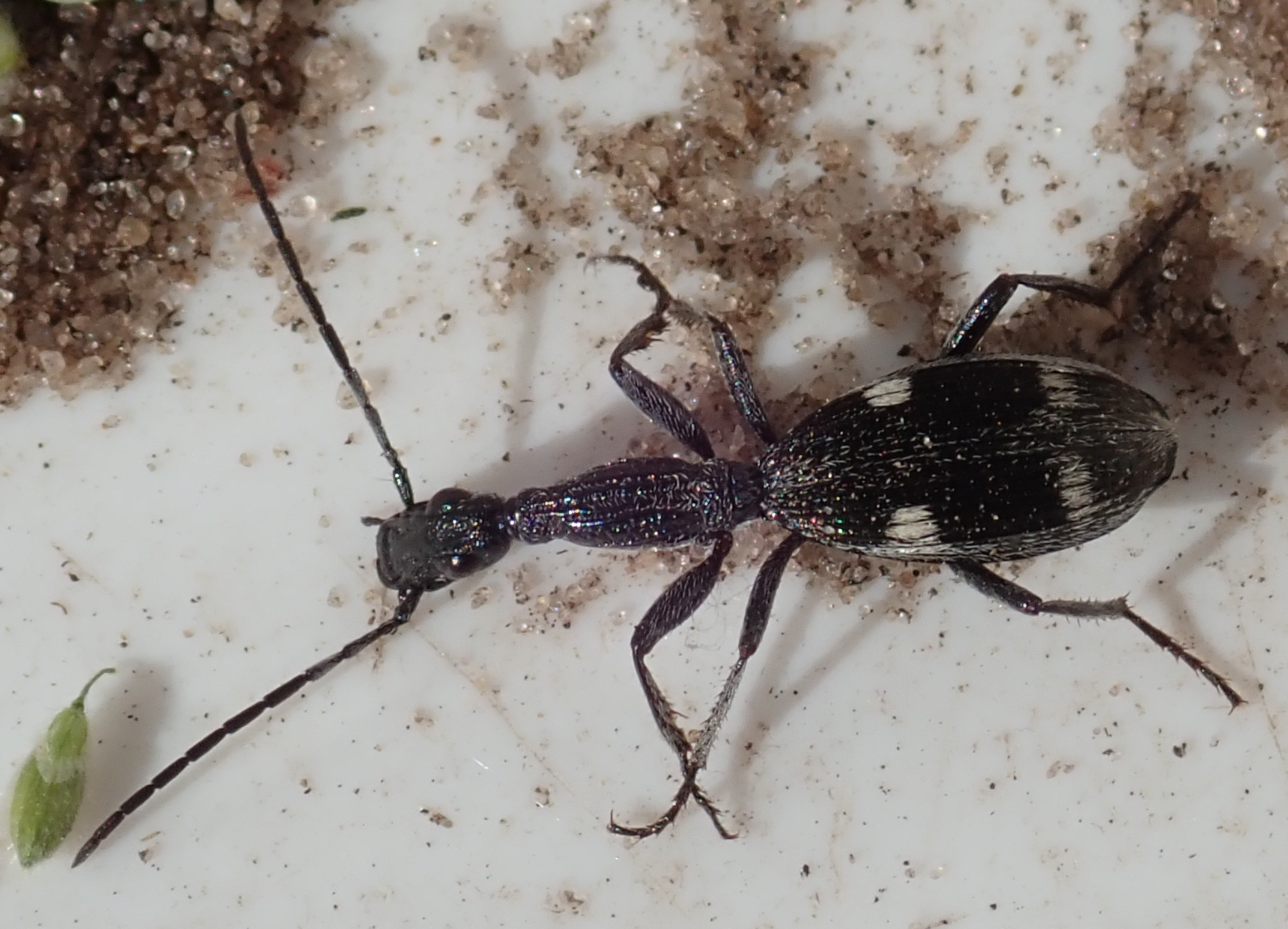
- Atractonotus mulsantii

Scientific classification
- Domain: Eukaryota
- Kingdom: Animalia
- Phylum: Arthropoda
- Class: Insecta
- Order: Coleoptera
- Suborder: Adephaga
- Family: Carabidae
- Subfamily: Anthiinae
- Tribe: Anthiini
- Genus: Atractonotus; Perroud, 1847

= Atractonotus =

Genus of beetles

Atractonotus is a genus in the beetle family Carabidae. There are at least two described species in Atractonotus.

== Species ==
These two species belong to the genus Atractonotus:

- Atractonotus mulsantii Perroud, 1847 (Africa)
- Atractonotus puncticollis Schüle & Heinz, 2013 (Zambia)
