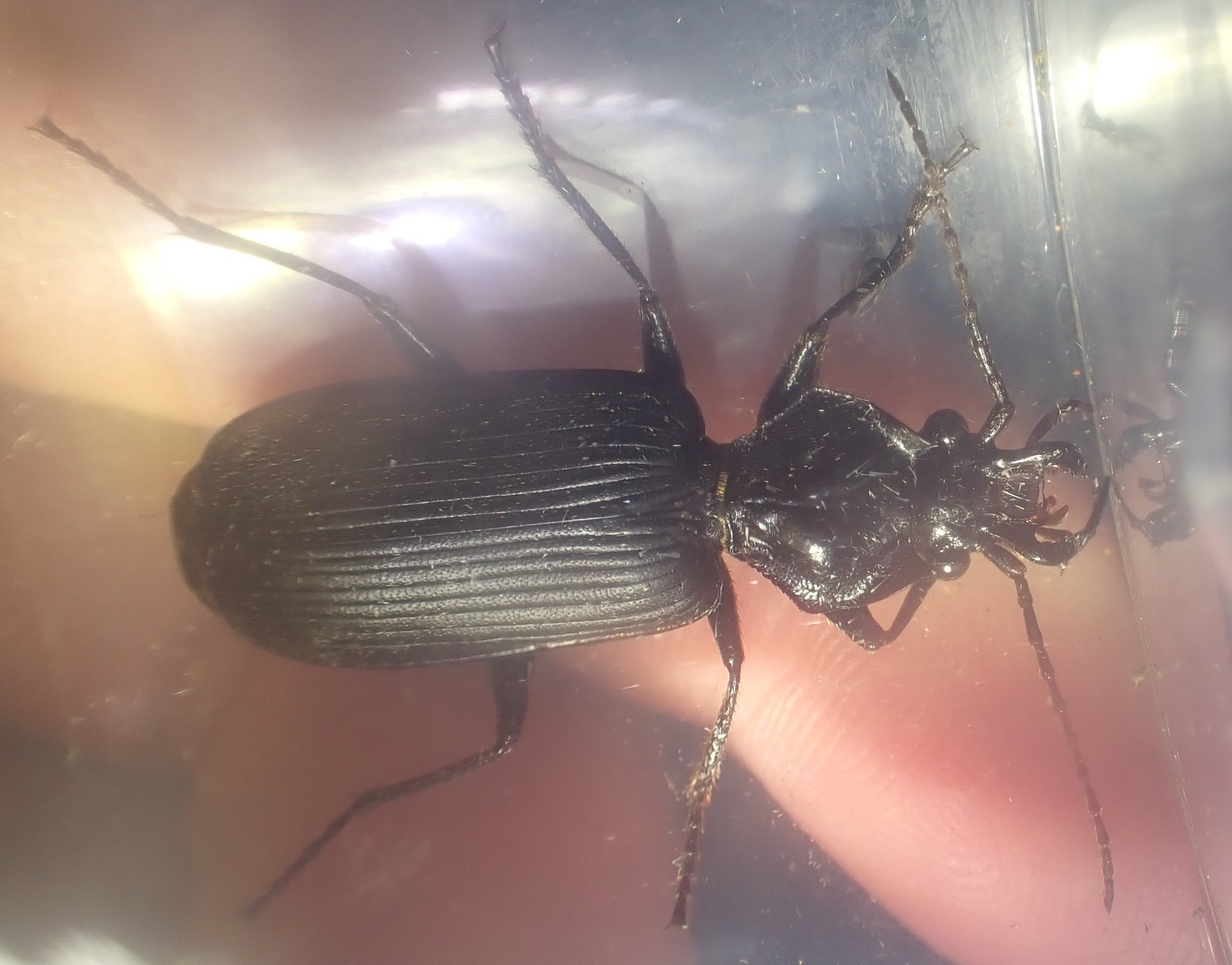

Scientific classification
- Kingdom: Animalia
- Phylum: Arthropoda
- Class: Insecta
- Order: Coleoptera
- Suborder: Adephaga
- Family: Carabidae
- Tribe: Helluonini
- Subtribe: Helluonina
- Genus: Neohelluo; Sloane, 1914
- Species: N. angulicollis

Binomial name
- Neohelluo angulicollis Sloane, 1914

= Neohelluo =

Neohelluo angulicollis

Genus of beetles

Neohelluo is a genus of ground beetles in the family Carabidae. It is monotypic, being represented by the single species, Neohelluo angulicollis, which is found in Australia.
