= Helluomorphoides clairvillei =

Scientific classification
- Kingdom: Animalia
- Phylum: Arthropoda
- Class: Insecta
- Order: Coleoptera
- Suborder: Adephaga
- Family: Carabidae
- Genus: Helluomorphoides
- Species: H. clairvillei

Binomial name
- Helluomorphoides clairvillei (Dejean, 1831)

Species of beetle

Helluomorphoides clairvillei is a species of flat-horned ground beetle in the family Carabidae. It is found in North America.
