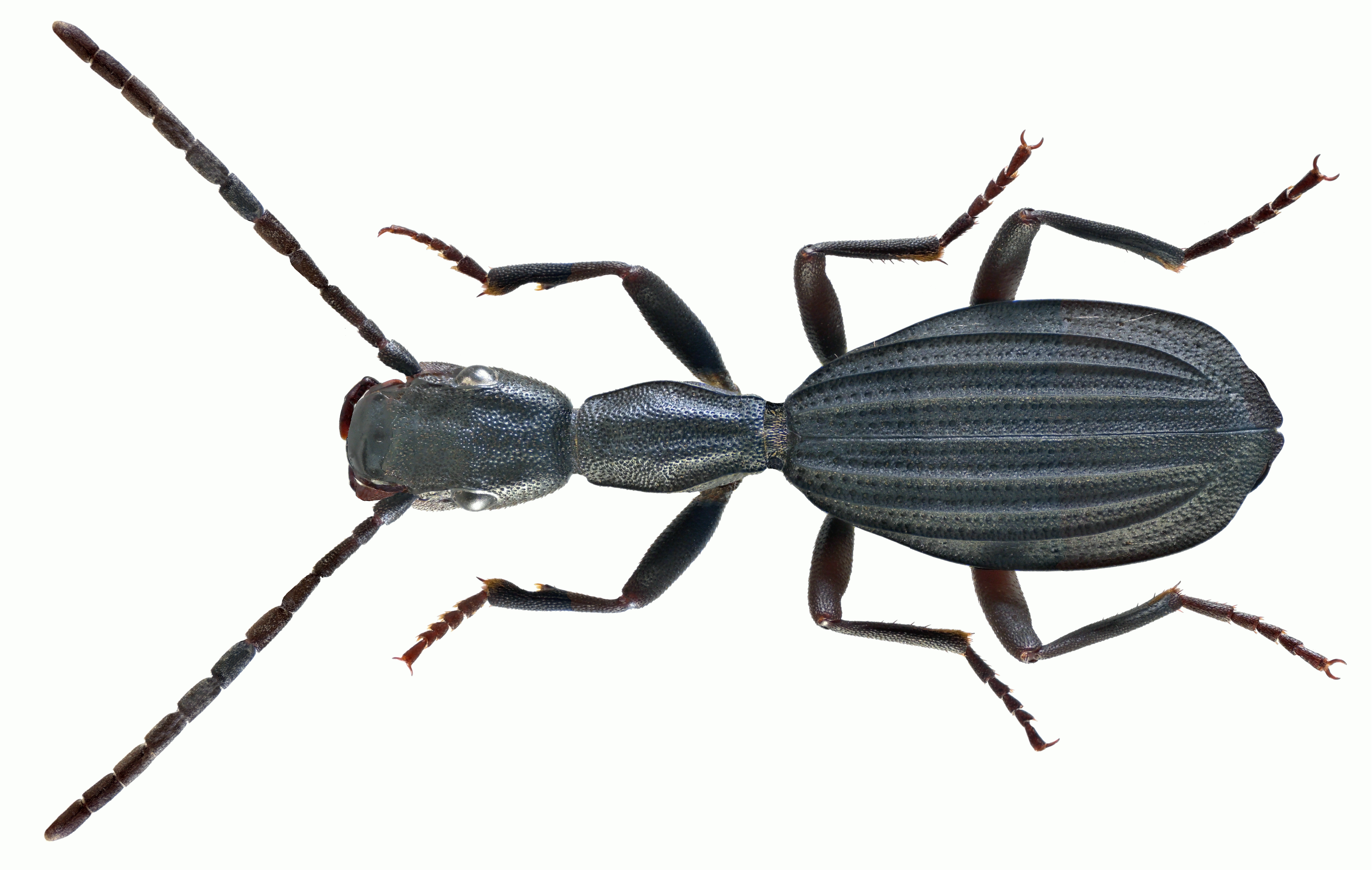
- Netrodera formicaria

Scientific classification
- Domain: Eukaryota
- Kingdom: Animalia
- Phylum: Arthropoda
- Class: Insecta
- Order: Coleoptera
- Suborder: Adephaga
- Family: Carabidae
- Subfamily: Anthiinae
- Tribe: Anthiini
- Genus: Netrodera; Chaudoir, 1850

= Netrodera =

Genus of beetles

Netrodera is a genus in the ground beetle family Carabidae. There are at least three described species in Netrodera, found in Africa.

== Species ==
These three species belong to the genus Netrodera:

- Netrodera formicaria (Erichson, 1843) (Angola, Zimbabwe, Botswana, Namibia, South Africa)
- Netrodera malangana Strohmeyer, 1928 (DR Congo, Angola)
- Netrodera vethi Bates, 1889 (Angola)
