= Helluomorphoides ferrugineus =

Scientific classification
- Domain: Eukaryota
- Kingdom: Animalia
- Phylum: Arthropoda
- Class: Insecta
- Order: Coleoptera
- Suborder: Adephaga
- Family: Carabidae
- Genus: Helluomorphoides
- Species: H. ferrugineus

Binomial name
- Helluomorphoides ferrugineus (LeConte, 1853)

Species of beetle

Helluomorphoides ferrugineus is a species of flat-horned ground beetle in the family Carabidae. It is found in North America.
