= Cycloloba =

Scientific classification
- Domain: Eukaryota
- Kingdom: Animalia
- Phylum: Arthropoda
- Class: Insecta
- Order: Coleoptera
- Suborder: Adephaga
- Family: Carabidae
- Subfamily: Anthiinae
- Tribe: Anthiini
- Genus: Cycloloba; Chaudoir, 1850

Genus of beetles

Cycloloba is a genus in the ground beetle family Carabidae. There are at least two described species in Cycloloba, found in Africa.

== Species ==
These two species belong to the genus Cycloloba:

- Cycloloba septemguttata (Fabricius, 1794) (South Africa)
- Cycloloba truncatipennis (Boheman, 1848) (Mozambique and South Africa)
