= Helluapterus =

Scientific classification
- Kingdom: Animalia
- Phylum: Arthropoda
- Class: Insecta
- Order: Coleoptera
- Suborder: Adephaga
- Family: Carabidae
- Tribe: Helluonini
- Subtribe: Helluonina
- Genus: Helluapterus; Sloane, 1914
- Species: H. niger

Binomial name
- Helluapterus niger Sloane, 1914

Genus of beetles

Helluapterus is a genus of carabids in the beetle family Carabidae. This genus has a single species, Helluapterus niger. It is found in Australia.
