= Platyhelluo =

Scientific classification
- Domain: Eukaryota
- Kingdom: Animalia
- Phylum: Arthropoda
- Class: Insecta
- Order: Coleoptera
- Suborder: Adephaga
- Family: Carabidae
- Tribe: Helluonini
- Subtribe: Helluonina
- Genus: Platyhelluo; Baehr, 2005
- Species: P. weiri

Binomial name
- Platyhelluo weiri Baehr, 2005

Genus of beetles

Platyhelluo is a genus in the ground beetle family Carabidae. This genus has a single species, Platyhelluo weiri.
