= Schuelea =

Scientific classification
- Domain: Eukaryota
- Kingdom: Animalia
- Phylum: Arthropoda
- Class: Insecta
- Order: Coleoptera
- Suborder: Adephaga
- Family: Carabidae
- Subfamily: Anthiinae
- Tribe: Physocrotaphini
- Genus: Schuelea; Baehr, 2004

Genus of beetles

Schuelea is a genus in the ground beetle family Carabidae. There are at least three described species in Schuelea.

== Species ==
These three species belong to the genus Schuelea:

- Schuelea arfakensis (Baehr, 1987) (Indonesia, New Guinea)
- Schuelea drumonti Baehr, 2004
- Schuelea monstrosa Baehr, 2004 (Indonesia, New Guinea)
