= Eccoptoptera =

Scientific classification
- Domain: Eukaryota
- Kingdom: Animalia
- Phylum: Arthropoda
- Class: Insecta
- Order: Coleoptera
- Suborder: Adephaga
- Family: Carabidae
- Subfamily: Anthiinae
- Tribe: Anthiini
- Genus: Eccoptoptera; Chaudoir, 1878

Genus of beetles

Eccoptoptera is a genus in the ground beetle family Carabidae. There are two described species in Eccoptoptera, found in Africa.

== Species ==
These two species belong to the genus Eccoptoptera:

- Eccoptoptera cupricollis Chaudoir, 1878
- Eccoptoptera mutilloides (Bertoloni, 1857)
