= Pogonoglossus =

Scientific classification
- Domain: Eukaryota
- Kingdom: Animalia
- Phylum: Arthropoda
- Class: Insecta
- Order: Coleoptera
- Suborder: Adephaga
- Family: Carabidae
- Subfamily: Anthiinae
- Tribe: Physocrotaphini
- Genus: Pogonoglossus; Chaudoir, 1863

Genus of beetles

Pogonoglossus is a genus in the beetle family Carabidae. There are more than 30 described species in Pogonoglossus.

== Species ==
These 37 species belong to the genus Pogonoglossus:

- Pogonoglossus augustae Louwerens, 1949 (Indonesia)
- Pogonoglossus carinipennis Bates, 1892 (Myanmar)
- Pogonoglossus chaudoirii Gestro, 1875 (Cambodia)
- Pogonoglossus danielsi Baehr, 2007 (Australia)
- Pogonoglossus frater Baehr, 2014 (Australia)
- Pogonoglossus giganteus Baehr, 2005
- Pogonoglossus glabricollis Emden, 1937 (Indonesia and New Guinea)
- Pogonoglossus grossulus Darlington, 1968 (New Guinea and Papua)
- Pogonoglossus horni Sloane, 1907 (New Guinea)
- Pogonoglossus inarmatus Baehr, 1988 (Australia)
- Pogonoglossus inflaticeps (Sloane, 1904) (Australia)
- Pogonoglossus intermedius Bouchard, 1903 (Indonesia)
- Pogonoglossus laevissimus Baehr, 1995 (Indonesia and New Guinea)
- Pogonoglossus latior Darlington, 1968 (Indonesia and New Guinea)
- Pogonoglossus latus Andrewes, 1937 (Indonesia)
- Pogonoglossus major Darlington, 1968 (New Guinea and Papua)
- Pogonoglossus minor Darlington, 1968 (Indonesia and New Guinea)
- Pogonoglossus missai Baehr, 2005
- Pogonoglossus montanus Bouchard, 1903 (Indonesia)
- Pogonoglossus obliquus Darlington, 1968 (New Guinea and Papua)
- Pogonoglossus papua Darlington, 1968 (Indonesia and New Guinea)
- Pogonoglossus parvus Darlington, 1968 (Oceania)
- Pogonoglossus physoides Andrewes, 1937 (Indonesia and New Guinea)
- Pogonoglossus porosus (Sloane, 1904) (Australia)
- Pogonoglossus punctulatus Louwerens, 1969
- Pogonoglossus rufopiceus Baehr, 1993 (Australia)
- Pogonoglossus schaumii Chaudoir, 1869 (Indonesia)
- Pogonoglossus sciurus Andrewes, 1937 (Indonesia)
- Pogonoglossus soror Baehr, 2014 (Australia)
- Pogonoglossus sumatrensis Gestro, 1875 (Indonesia and Borneo)
- Pogonoglossus sylvaticus Bouchard, 1903 (Indonesia)
- Pogonoglossus tagalus Heller, 1916 (Philippines)
- Pogonoglossus taylori Darlington, 1968 (Indonesia and New Guinea)
- Pogonoglossus torvus Andrewes, 1937 (Indonesia)
- Pogonoglossus truncatus (Schmidt-Goebel, 1846) (Indomalaya)
- Pogonoglossus unicolor (W.J.MacLeay, 1886) (New Guinea and Papua)
- Pogonoglossus validicornis Chaudoir, 1863 (Indonesia)
