= Ametroglossus =

Scientific classification
- Kingdom: Animalia
- Phylum: Arthropoda
- Class: Insecta
- Order: Coleoptera
- Suborder: Adephaga
- Family: Carabidae
- Tribe: Helluonini
- Subtribe: Helluonina
- Genus: Ametroglossus; Sloane, 1914
- Species: A. ater

Binomial name
- Ametroglossus ater (W.J.MacLeay, 1887)

Genus of beetles

Ametroglossus is a genus of ground beetles in the family Carabidae. This genus has a single species, Ametroglossus ater, found in Australia.
