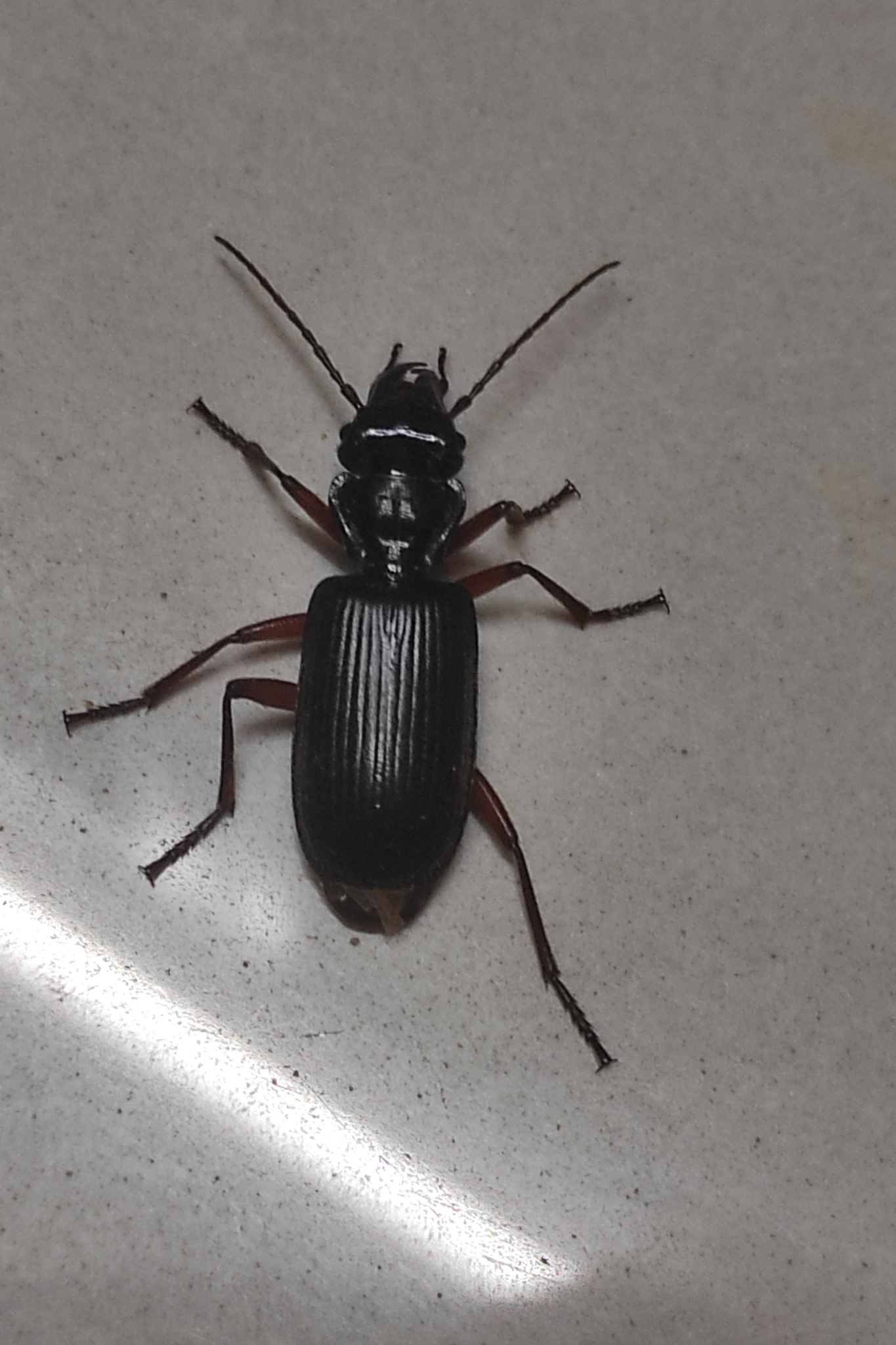
- Helluodes devagiriensis

Scientific classification
- Kingdom: Animalia
- Phylum: Arthropoda
- Class: Insecta
- Order: Coleoptera
- Suborder: Adephaga
- Family: Carabidae
- Subfamily: Anthiinae
- Tribe: Physocrotaphini
- Genus: Helluodes; Westwood, 1847

= Helluodes =

Genus of beetles in the family Carabidae

Helluodes is a genus of carabids in the beetle family Carabidae.

== Species ==
These three species belong to the genus Helluodes:

- Helluodes devagiriensis Sabu; Abhita & Zhao, 2008 (India)
- Helluodes taprobanae Westwood, 1847 (Sri Lanka)
- Helluodes westwoodii Chaudoir, 1869 (Bangladesh, India)
