= Aenigma iris =

Scientific classification
- Kingdom: Animalia
- Phylum: Arthropoda
- Clade: Pancrustacea
- Class: Insecta
- Order: Coleoptera
- Suborder: Adephaga
- Family: Carabidae
- Tribe: Helluonini
- Subtribe: Helluonina
- Genus: Aenigma; Newman, 1836
- Species: A. iris

Binomial name
- Aenigma iris Newman, 1836

Species of beetle

Aenigma is a genus of ground beetles in the family Carabidae. This genus has a single species, Aenigma iris, found in eastern Australia.
