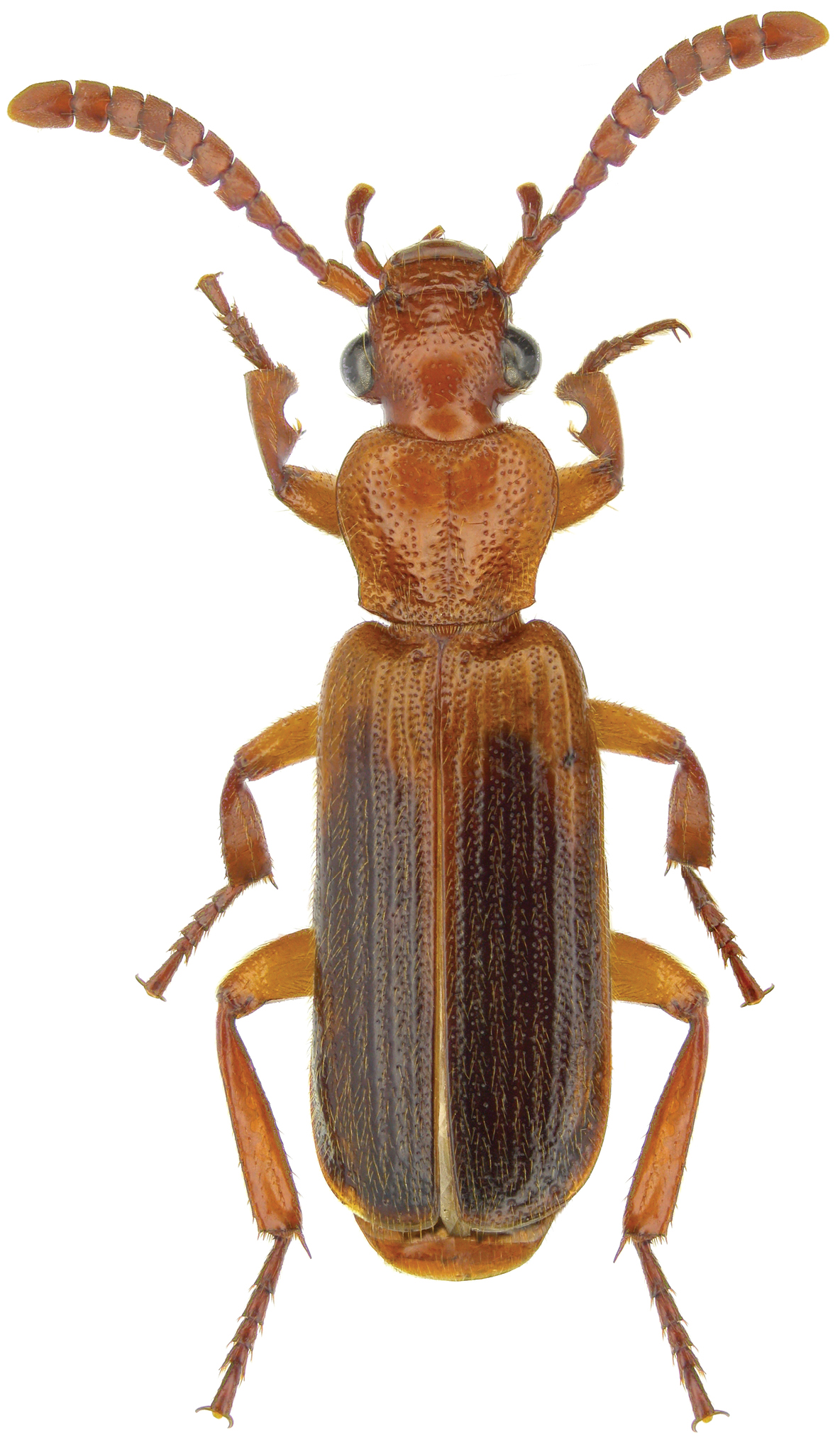
- Helluomorphoides praeustus bicolor (Harris). Adults of most carabids are opportunist predators or scavengers but those of Helluomorphoides seem to have adopted a different, more dangerous life-style.

Scientific classification
- Kingdom: Animalia
- Phylum: Arthropoda
- Class: Insecta
- Order: Coleoptera
- Suborder: Adephaga
- Family: Carabidae
- Genus: Helluomorphoides
- Species: H. praeustus

Binomial name
- Helluomorphoides praeustus (Dejean, 1825)

= Helluomorphoides praeustus =

Species of beetle

Helluomorphoides praeustus is a species of flat-horned ground beetle in the family Carabidae. It is found in North America.

== Subspecies ==
These three subspecies belong to the species Helluomorphoides praeustus:

- Helluomorphoides praeustus bicolor (T. Harris, 1828)
- Helluomorphoides praeustus floridanus Ball, 1956
- Helluomorphoides praeustus praeustus (Dejean, 1825)
