= Baeoglossa =

Scientific classification
- Kingdom: Animalia
- Phylum: Arthropoda
- Class: Insecta
- Order: Coleoptera
- Suborder: Adephaga
- Family: Carabidae
- Genus: Baeoglossa; Chaudoir, 1850

Genus of beetles

Baeoglossa is a genus of beetles in the family Carabidae, containing the following species:

- Baeoglossa melanaria (Boheman, 1846)
- Baeoglossa villosa (Thunberg, 1806)
