= Holoponerus =

Scientific classification
- Kingdom: Animalia
- Phylum: Arthropoda
- Class: Insecta
- Order: Coleoptera
- Suborder: Adephaga
- Family: Carabidae
- Tribe: Physocrotaphini
- Genus: Holoponerus; Fairmaire, 1883
- Species: H. godeffroyi

Binomial name
- Holoponerus godeffroyi (Fairmaire, 1881)

Synonyms
- Pamponerus Fairmaire, 1881

Genus of beetles

Holoponerus is a genus in the ground beetle family Carabidae. This genus has a single species, Holoponerus godeffroyi, found in New Britain.
