= Pleuracanthus =

Scientific classification
- Domain: Eukaryota
- Kingdom: Animalia
- Phylum: Arthropoda
- Class: Insecta
- Order: Coleoptera
- Suborder: Adephaga
- Family: Carabidae
- Genus: †Pleuracanthus; Gray, 1832

Genus of beetles

Pleuracanthus is an extinct genus of beetles in the family Carabidae, with fossils found in Europe and Oklahoma. These four species belong to the genus Pleuracanthus:

- Pleuracanthus inca Reichardt, 1974
- Pleuracanthus psittacus Reichardt, 1974
- Pleuracanthus sulcipennis Gray, 1832
- Pleuracanthus tridens Reichardt, 1974
