= Physocrotaphus =

Scientific classification
- Domain: Eukaryota
- Kingdom: Animalia
- Phylum: Arthropoda
- Class: Insecta
- Order: Coleoptera
- Suborder: Adephaga
- Family: Carabidae
- Tribe: Physocrotaphini
- Genus: Physocrotaphus; Parry, 1849
- Species: P. ceylonicus

Binomial name
- Physocrotaphus ceylonicus Parry, 1849

Genus of beetles

Physocrotaphus is a genus in the ground beetle family Carabidae. This genus has a single species, Physocrotaphus ceylonicus. It is found in Sri Lanka.
