= Triaenogenius =

Scientific classification
- Kingdom: Animalia
- Phylum: Arthropoda
- Class: Insecta
- Order: Coleoptera
- Suborder: Adephaga
- Family: Carabidae
- Genus: Triaenogenius; Chaudoir, 1877

Genus of beetles

Triaenogenius is a genus of beetles in the family Carabidae, containing the following species:

- Triaenogenius arabicus Gestro, 1889
- Triaenogenius carinulatus (Fairmaire, 1887)
- Triaenogenius congoensis Basilewsky, 1959
- Triaenogenius corpulentus Chaudoir, 1877
- Triaenogenius denticulatus Basilewsky, 1959
- Triaenogenius ferox (Erichson, 1843)
- Triaenogenius gerstaeckeri (Chaudoir, 1877)
- Triaenogenius kochi Basilewsky, 1964
- Triaenogenius lugubrinus (Boheman, 1860)
- Triaenogenius lugubris (Schaum, 1863)
- Triaenogenius sculpturatus (Gerstaecker, 1867)
