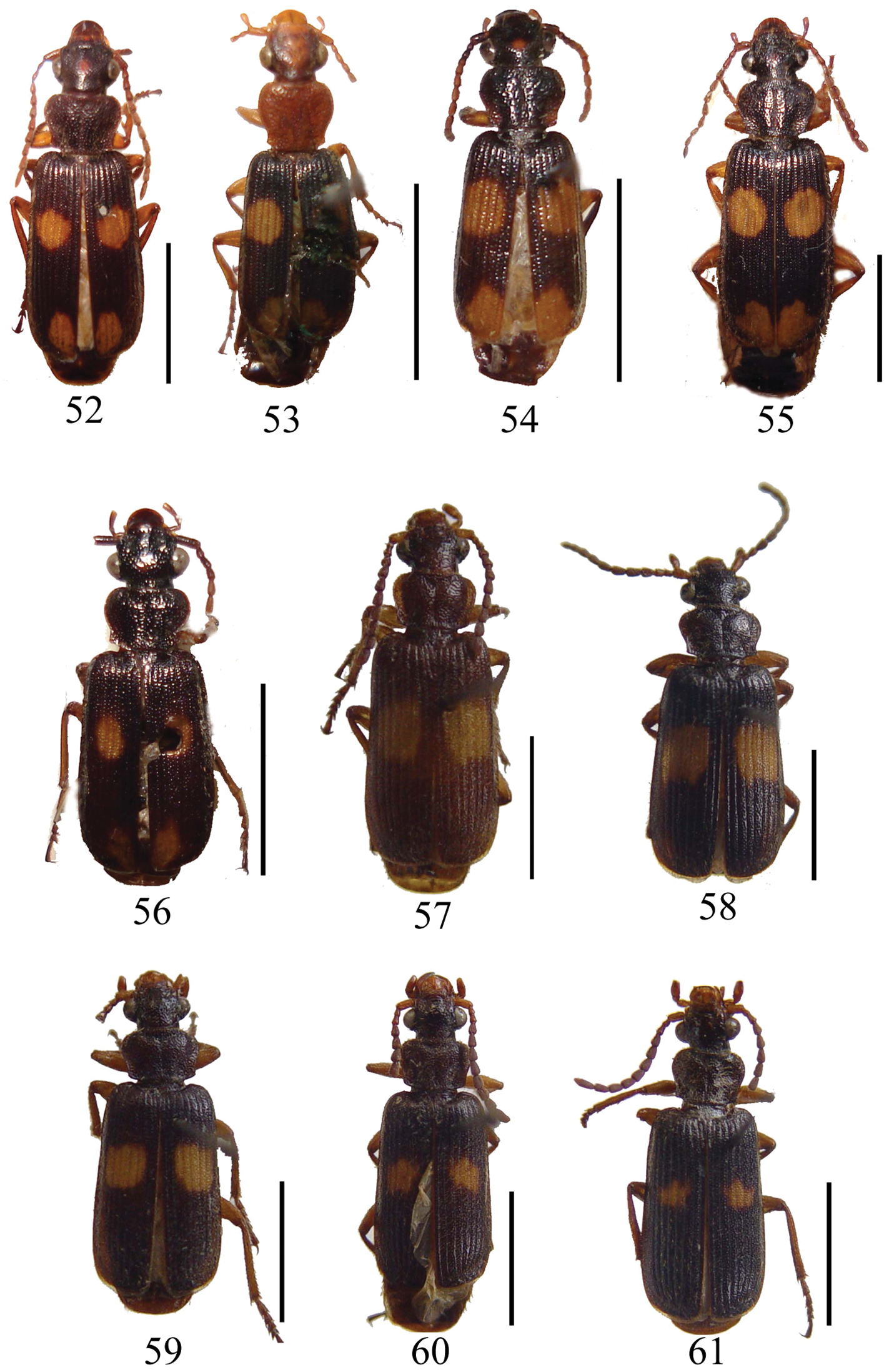
- 52 M. tripustulatus 53 M. chaudoiri 54 M. nigrotibialis 55 M. bensoni 56 M. deuvie 57 M. fuscipennis 58 M. solidipalpis 59 M. cheni 60 M. quadratus 61 M. sinuatilabris

Scientific classification
- Kingdom: Animalia
- Phylum: Arthropoda
- Clade: Pancrustacea
- Class: Insecta
- Order: Coleoptera
- Suborder: Adephaga
- Family: Carabidae
- Genus: Macrocheilus; Hope, 1838

= Macrocheilus =

Genus of beetles

Macrocheilus is a genus of beetles in the family Carabidae, found in Africa and Asia.

== Species ==
These 59 species belong to the genus Macrocheilus:

- Macrocheilus allardi Basilewsky, 1957
- Macrocheilus alluaudi Burgeon, 1937
- Macrocheilus angustatus Basilewsky, 1949
- Macrocheilus asteriscus (White, 1844)
- Macrocheilus bandipurensis Akhil; Divya & Sabu, 2019
- Macrocheilus basilewskyi A.Serrano, 2000
- Macrocheilus bensoni Hope, 1838
- Macrocheilus bicolor Andrewes, 1920
- Macrocheilus biguttatus (Gory, 1832)
- Macrocheilus bimaculatus (Dejean, 1831)
- Macrocheilus binotatus Andrewes, 1931
- Macrocheilus biplagiatus (Boheman, 1848)
- Macrocheilus burgeoni Basilewsky, 1967
- Macrocheilus chaudoiri Andrewes, 1919
- Macrocheilus cheni Zhao & Tian, 2010
- Macrocheilus chinnarensis Akhil; Divya & Sabu, 2019
- Macrocheilus clasispilus Basilewsky, 1967
- Macrocheilus crampeli Alluaud, 1916
- Macrocheilus cribrarius Fairmaire, 1901
- Macrocheilus cruciatus (Marc, 1840)
- Macrocheilus deuvei Zhao & Tian, 2012
- Macrocheilus devagiriensis Shiju & Sabu, 2012
- Macrocheilus diplospilus Basilewsky, 1967
- Macrocheilus dorsalis (Klug, 1834)
- Macrocheilus dorsiger (Chaudoir, 1876)
- Macrocheilus elegantulus Burgeon, 1937
- Macrocheilus ferruginipes Fairmaire, 1892
- Macrocheilus fuscipennis Zhao & Tian, 2010
- Macrocheilus gigas Zhao & Tian, 2010
- Macrocheilus hybridus Péringuey, 1896
- Macrocheilus immanis Andrewes, 1920
- Macrocheilus impictus (Wiedemann, 1823)
- Macrocheilus labrosus (Dejean, 1831)
- Macrocheilus longicollis Péringuey, 1904
- Macrocheilus macromaculatus Louwerens, 1949
- Macrocheilus madagascariensis Basilewsky, 1953
- Macrocheilus moraisi A.Serrano, 2000
- Macrocheilus niger Andrewes, 1920
- Macrocheilus nigrotibialis Heller, 1900
- Macrocheilus ocellatus Basilewsky, 1953
- Macrocheilus overlaeti Burgeon, 1937
- Macrocheilus parvimaculatus Zhao & Tian, 2010
- Macrocheilus perrieri Fairmaire, 1899
- Macrocheilus persimilis Basilewsky, 1970
- Macrocheilus proximus Péringuey, 1896
- Macrocheilus quadratus Zhao & Tian, 2010
- Macrocheilus quadrinotatus Burgeon, 1937
- Macrocheilus saulcyi (Chevrolat, 1854)
- Macrocheilus scapularis (Reiche, 1843)
- Macrocheilus sinuatilabris Zhao & Tian, 2010
- Macrocheilus solidipalpis Zhao & Tian, 2010
- Macrocheilus spectandus Péringuey, 1904
- Macrocheilus taedatus Basilewsky, 1960
- Macrocheilus tripustulatus (Dejean, 1825)
- Macrocheilus vanharteni Felix & Muilwijk, 2007
- Macrocheilus varians Péringuey, 1904
- Macrocheilus viduatus Péringuey, 1898
- Macrocheilus vinctus Basilewsky, 1960
- Macrocheilus vitalisi Andrewes, 1920
