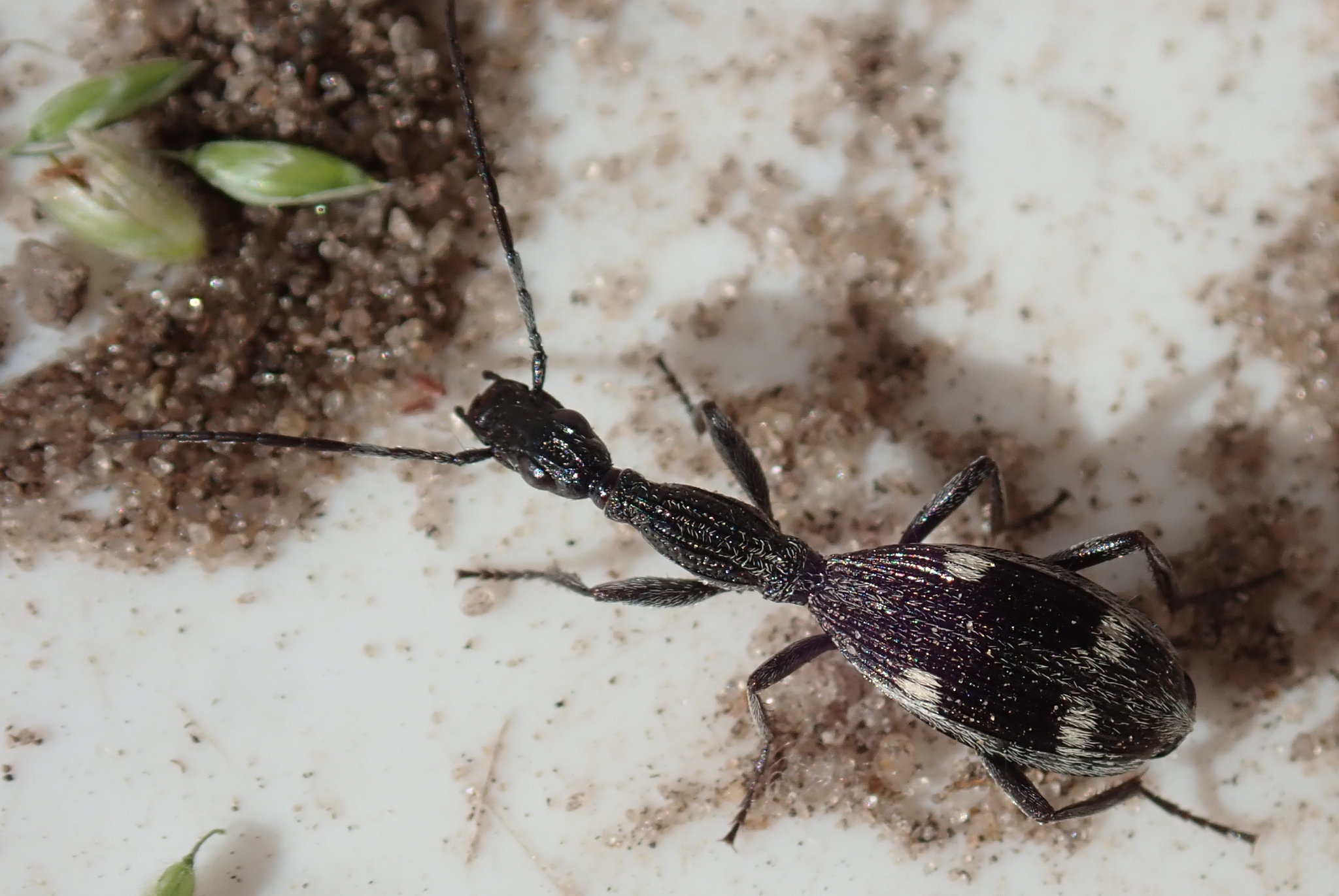
- Atractonotus mulsanti, Botswana

Scientific classification
- Kingdom: Animalia
- Phylum: Arthropoda
- Class: Insecta
- Order: Coleoptera
- Suborder: Adephaga
- Family: Carabidae
- Subfamily: Anthiinae
- Tribe: Helluonini; Hope, 1838

Subtribes
- Helluonina Hope, 1838; Omphrina Jedlicka, 1941

= Helluonini =

Tribe of beetles

Helluonini is a tribe of ground beetles in the family Carabidae. There are more than 20 genera and 190 described species in Helluonini.

== See also ==
Anthiinae, for a list of ~26 Helluonini genera and their distribution range.
