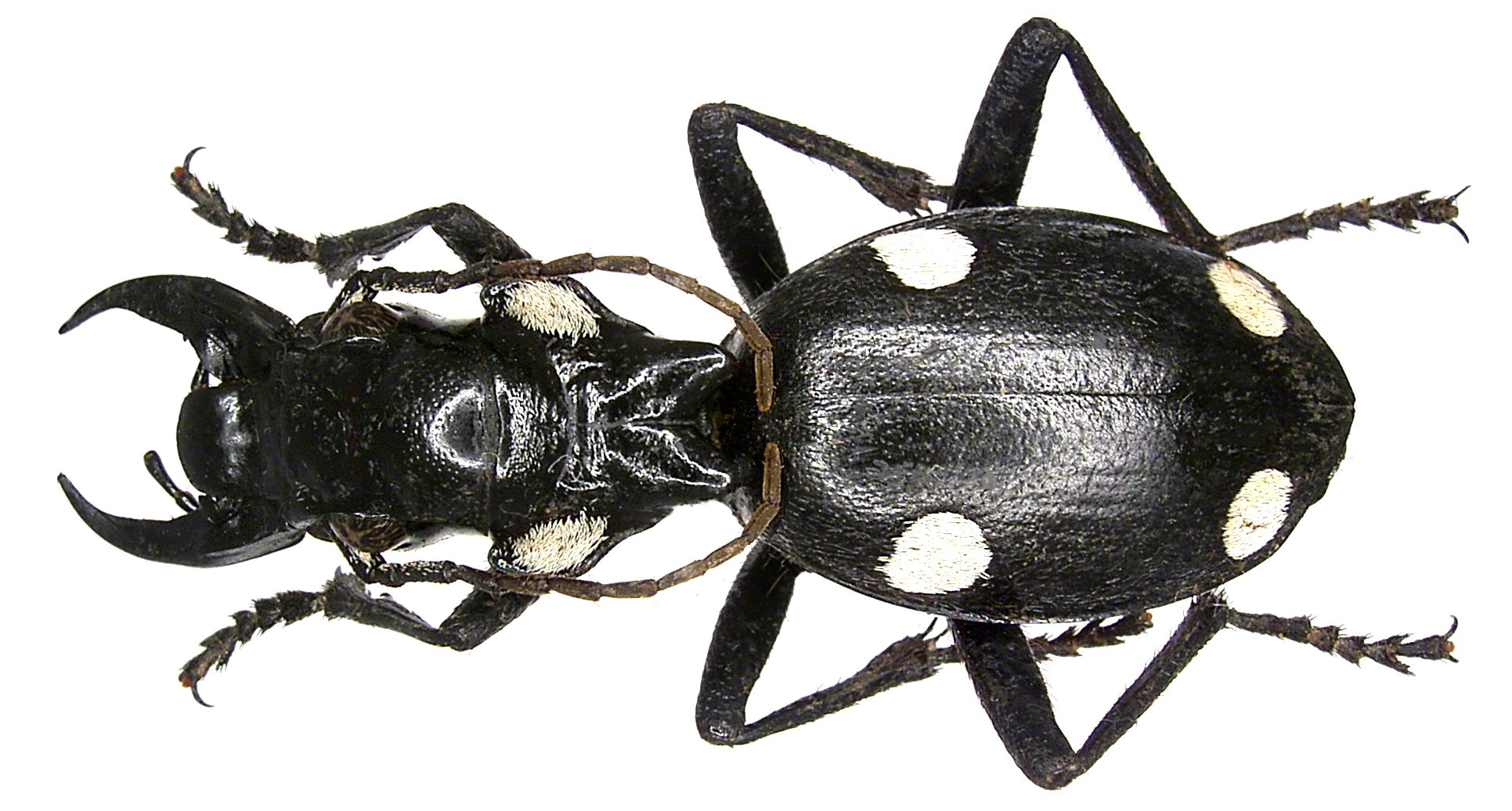

Scientific classification
- Domain: Eukaryota
- Kingdom: Animalia
- Phylum: Arthropoda
- Class: Insecta
- Order: Coleoptera
- Suborder: Adephaga
- Family: Carabidae
- Subfamily: Anthiinae; Bonelli, 1813

= Anthiinae (beetle) =

Subfamily of beetles

Anthiinae is a subfamily of beetles in the family Carabidae, containing the following genera:

Tribe Anthiini Bonelli, 1813
Anthia Weber, 1801 (Africa and southwest Asia)
Atractonotus Perroud, 1847 (Africa)
Baeoglossa Chaudoir, 1850 (Africa)
Cycloloba Chaudoir, 1850 (Africa)
Cypholoba Chaudoir, 1850 (Africa)
Eccoptoptera Chaudoir, 1878 (Africa)
Gonogenia Chaudoir, 1844 (Africa)
Netrodera Chaudoir, 1850 (Africa)
Tribe Helluonini Hope, 1838
Subtribe Helluonina Hope, 1838

Aenigma Newman, 1836 (Australia)
Ametroglossus Sloane, 1914 (Australia)
Dicranoglossus Chaudoir, 1872 (Australia)
Epimicodema Sloane, 1914 (Australia)
Gigadema J.Thomson, 1859 (Australia)
Helluapterus Sloane, 1914 (Australia)
Helluarchus Sloane, 1914 (Australia)
Helluo Bonelli, 1813 (Australia)
Helluodema Laporte, 1867 (Australia, Indonesia, New Guinea)
Helluonidius Chaudoir, 1872 (Australia, Indonesia, New Guinea)
Helluopapua Darlington, 1968 (Indonesia, New Guinea)
Helluosoma Laporte, 1867 (Australia and New Guinea)
Neohelluo Sloane, 1914 (Australia)
Platyhelluo Baehr, 2005

Subtribe Omphrina Jedlicka, 1941

Colfax Andrewes, 1920 (Indomalaya, China)
Creagris Nietner, 1857 (Indomalaya, Australasia)
Dailodontus Reiche, 1843 (South America)
Erephognathus Alluaud, 1932 (Madagascar)
Helluobrochus Reichardt, 1974 (Central and South America)
Helluomorpha Laporte, 1834 (South America)
Helluomorphoides Ball, 1951 (North, Central, and South America)
Macrocheilus Hope, 1838 (Africa, Asia)
Meladroma Motschulsky, 1855 (Africa)
Omphra Dejean, 1825 (Indomalaya)
Pleuracanthus Gray, 1832 (Peru, Brazil)
Triaenogenius Chaudoir, 1877 (Africa)

Tribe Physocrotaphini Chaudoir, 1863
Anguloderus Anichtchenko & Sciaky, 2017 (Indonesia, New Guinea)
Foveocrotaphus Anichtchenko, 2014 (Myanmar)
Helluodes Westwood, 1847 (India, Bangladesh, Sri Lanka)
Holoponerus Fairmaire, 1883
Physocrotaphus Parry, 1849 (Sri Lanka)
Physoglossus Akhil & Sabu, 2020 (India)
Pogonoglossus Chaudoir, 1863 (Indomalaya, Australasia)
Schuelea Baehr, 2004 (Indonesia and New Guinea)
