= Fornasini =

Fornasini is an Italian surname from Bologna. People with that name include:

- Carlo Antonio Fornasini (1802/1805 – 1865), Italian ivory trader and amateur field naturalist
- Carlo Fornasini (1854–1931), Italian micropalaeontologist
- Giovanni Fornasini (1915–1944), Italian Roman Catholic priest and resistance fighter

== See also ==
- Fornasini's blind snake – Species of snake
- Afrixalus fornasini – Species of amphibian
- Anthia fornasinii – Species of beetle
- Lactoria fornasini – Species of fish
