= Anthia galla =

Scientific classification
- Kingdom: Animalia
- Phylum: Arthropoda
- Clade: Pancrustacea
- Class: Insecta
- Order: Coleoptera
- Suborder: Adephaga
- Family: Carabidae
- Genus: Anthia
- Species: A. galla

Binomial name
- Anthia galla J. Thompson, 1859

Species of beetle

Anthia galla is a species of ground beetle in the subfamily Anthiinae. It was described by James Livingston Thomson in 1859.
