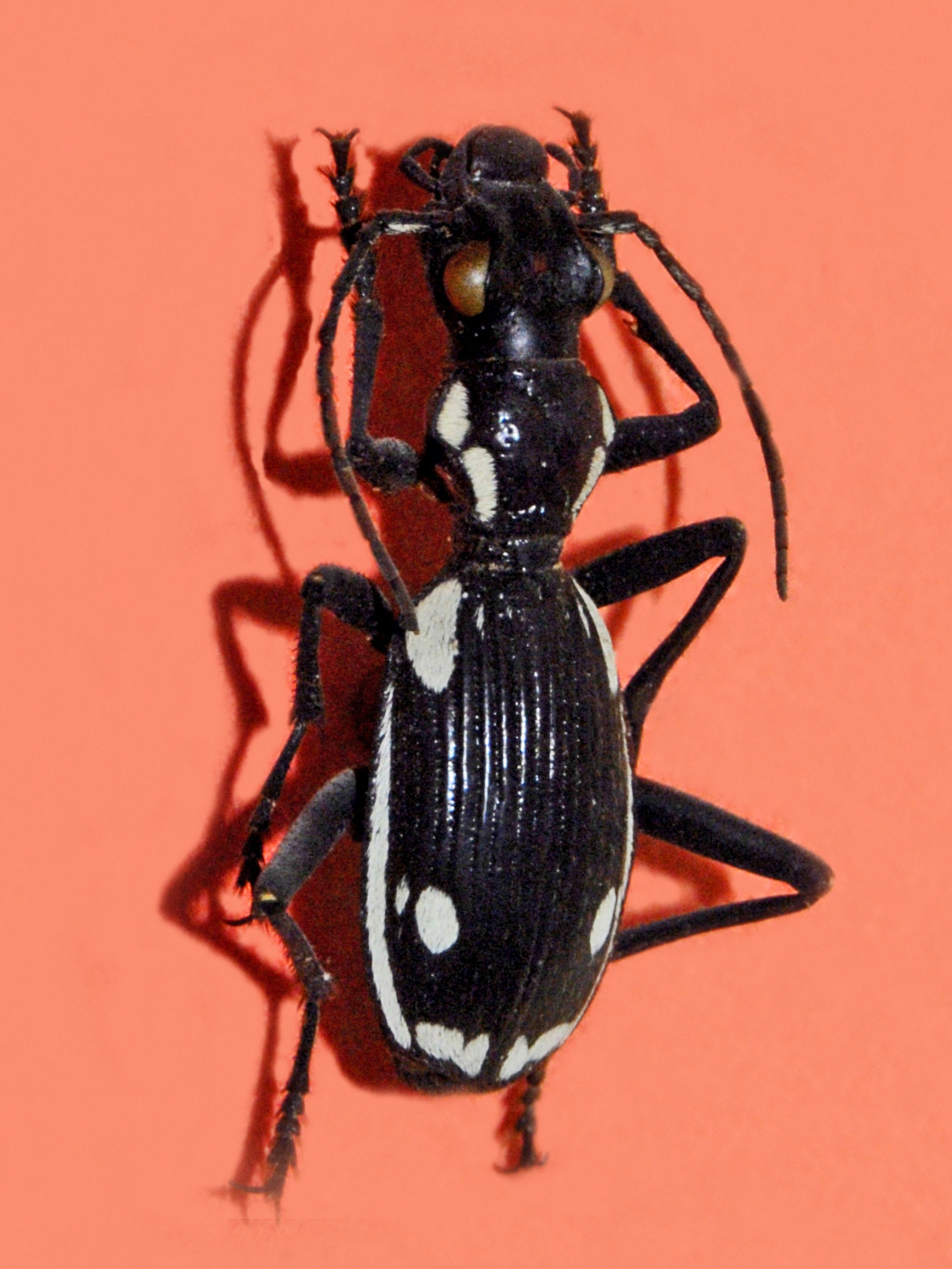
- Museum specimen of Anthia sexmaculata

Scientific classification
- Kingdom: Animalia
- Phylum: Arthropoda
- Clade: Pancrustacea
- Class: Insecta
- Order: Coleoptera
- Suborder: Adephaga
- Family: Carabidae
- Genus: Anthia
- Species: A. sexmaculata

Binomial name
- Anthia sexmaculata (Fabricius, 1787)

Synonyms
- Anthia pharaonum Bedel, 1914; Thermophilum sexmaculatum

= Anthia sexmaculata =

Species of beetle

Anthia sexmaculata, common name Egyptian predator beetle, is a species of beetles of the family Carabidae.

== Subspecies ==
Subspecies include:

- Anthia sexmaculata marginata Latreille, 1823
- Anthia sexmaculata sexmaculata (Fabricius, 1787)

== Description ==
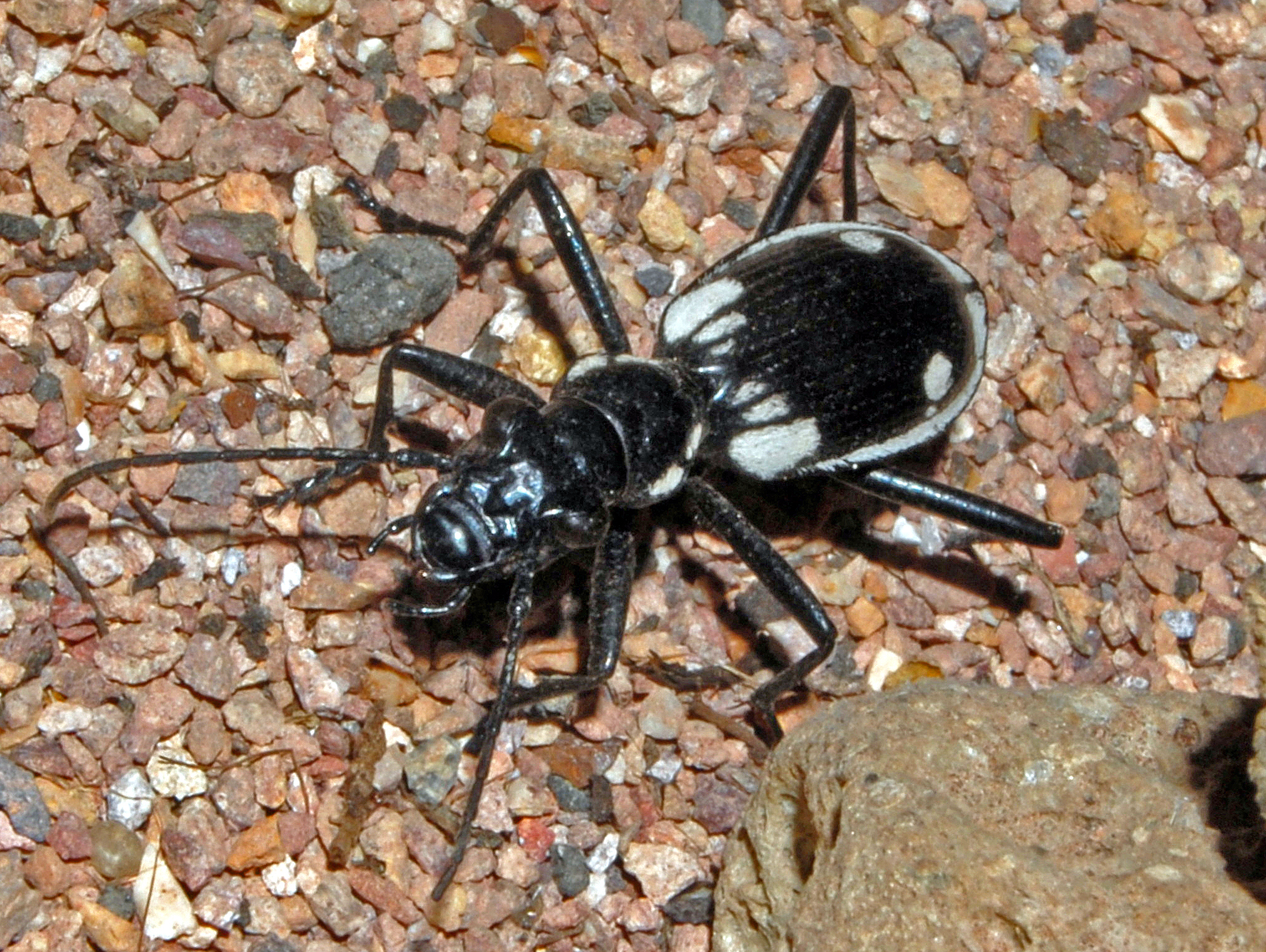
A live individual of Anthia sexmaculata

Anthia sexmaculata can reach a length of 40 millimetres (1.6 in). Its body is black with whitish markings. Incongruously, this species has got six markings (hence the Latin name sexmaculata), but it has about 14 pale markings on its body, but the number can vary.

== Behavior ==
These beetles have an unusual life cycle; young larvae enter ants' nests and remain there feeding on the ants and their larvae. They soon assume the scent of their ant hosts and are accepted as members of the colony. They move about with their bodies lifted high up off the ground to avoid the heat of the substrate. Their mandibles, although large, are not strong enough for defence. Instead, they squirt an acrid fluid from the anus to disable their enemies. This defence strategy has earned them the popular name of 'oogpister' i.e. 'eye-squirter'. Their large eyes, mandibles and speed of movement are similar to those of tiger beetles, but these beetles are flightless. They feed on other insects.

== Distribution and habitat ==
This species, originating in India, is distributed widely along the northern states of Africa (Algeria, Egypt, Libya, Mauritania, Morocco, Syria, Tunisia), from the Atlantic Ocean to the Red Sea. It is characteristic of desert regions.
