= Anthia oberthuri =

Scientific classification
- Kingdom: Animalia
- Phylum: Arthropoda
- Clade: Pancrustacea
- Class: Insecta
- Order: Coleoptera
- Suborder: Adephaga
- Family: Carabidae
- Genus: Anthia
- Species: A. oberthuri

Binomial name
- Anthia oberthuri Obst, 1906

Species of beetle

Anthia oberthuri is a species of ground beetle in the subfamily Anthiinae. It was described by Obst in 1906.
