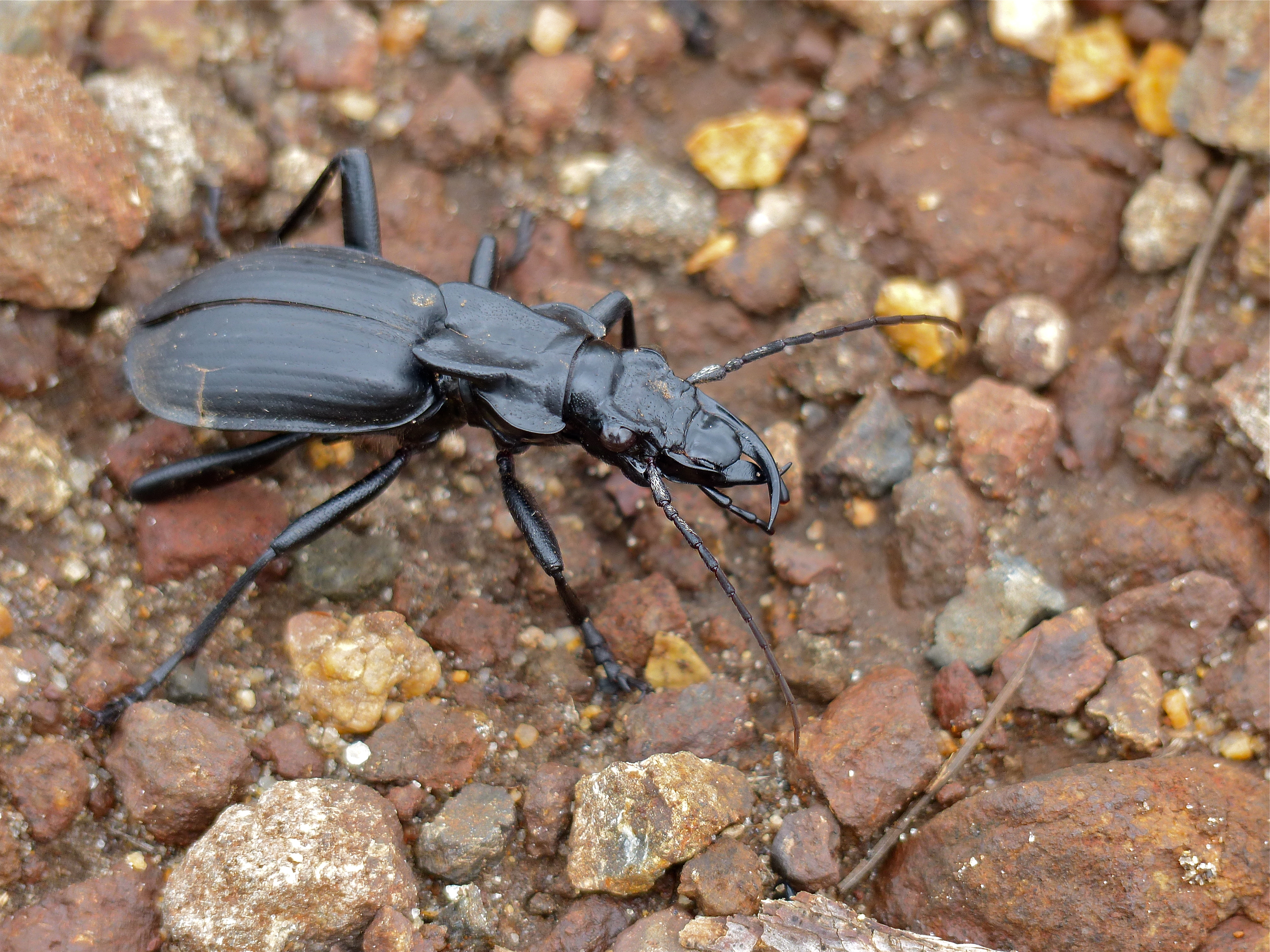
- Tyrant Ground Beetle (Anthia maxillosa) male - H1-4 Road South of Olifants, Kruger NP, SOUTH AFRICA

Scientific classification
- Kingdom: Animalia
- Phylum: Arthropoda
- Clade: Pancrustacea
- Class: Insecta
- Order: Coleoptera
- Suborder: Adephaga
- Family: Carabidae
- Genus: Anthia
- Species: A. maxillosa

Binomial name
- Anthia maxillosa (Fabricius, 1781)

= Anthia maxillosa =

Species of beetle

Anthia maxillosa is a species of ground beetle in the family Carabidae.
