= Anthia aemiliana =

Scientific classification
- Kingdom: Animalia
- Phylum: Arthropoda
- Clade: Pancrustacea
- Class: Insecta
- Order: Coleoptera
- Suborder: Adephaga
- Family: Carabidae
- Genus: Anthia
- Species: A. aemiliana

Binomial name
- Anthia aemiliana Dohrn, 1881

Species of beetle

Anthia aemiliana is a species of ground beetle in the subfamily Anthiinae. It was described by Anton Dohrn in 1881.
