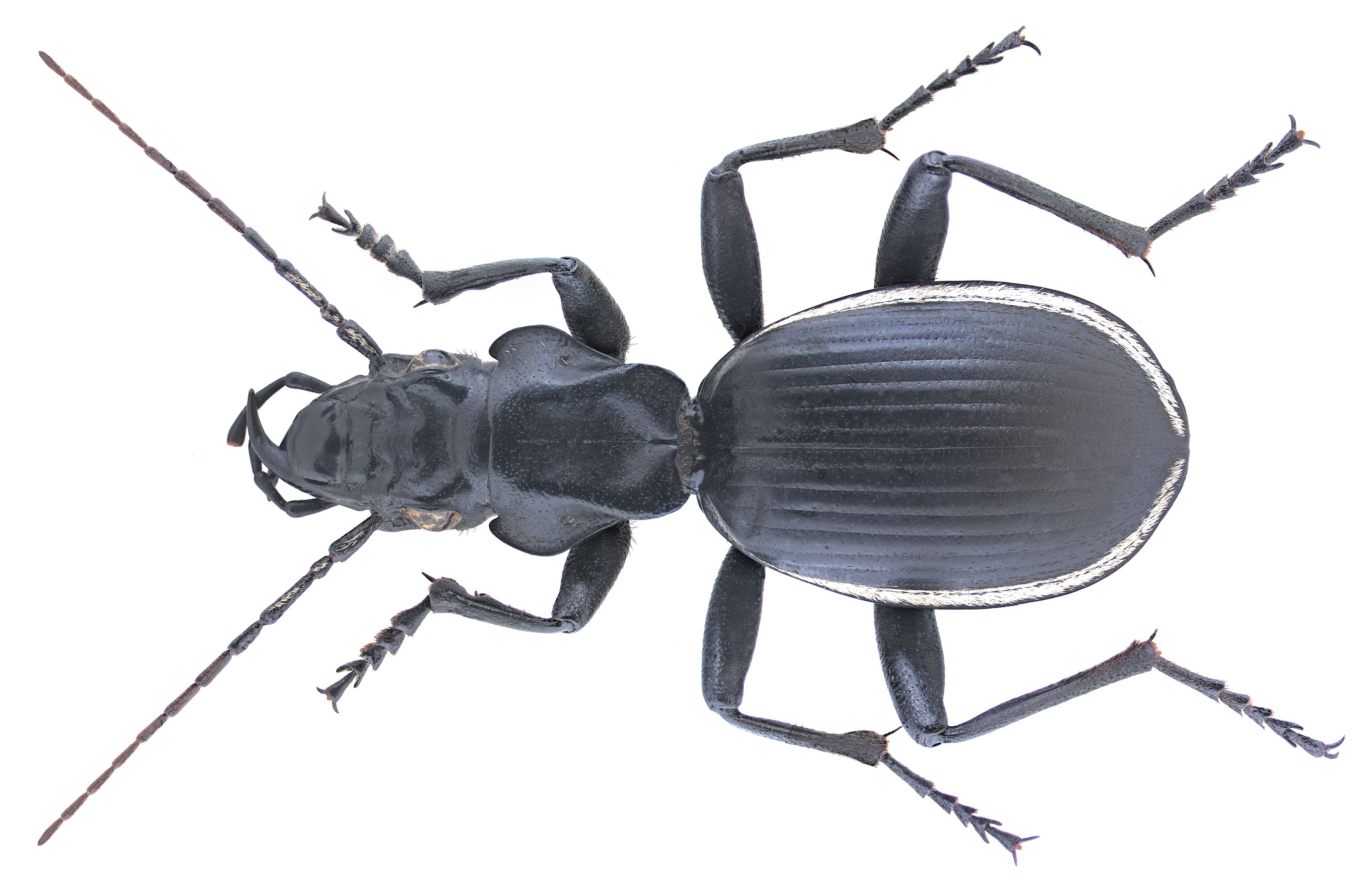

Scientific classification
- Kingdom: Animalia
- Phylum: Arthropoda
- Clade: Pancrustacea
- Class: Insecta
- Order: Coleoptera
- Suborder: Adephaga
- Family: Carabidae
- Genus: Anthia
- Species: A. cinctipennis

Binomial name
- Anthia cinctipennis Lequien, 1832

= Anthia cinctipennis =

Species of beetle

Anthia cinctipennis is a species of ground beetle in the subfamily Anthiinae. It was described by Lequien in 1832.
