= Anthia hedenborgi =

Scientific classification
- Kingdom: Animalia
- Phylum: Arthropoda
- Clade: Pancrustacea
- Class: Insecta
- Order: Coleoptera
- Suborder: Adephaga
- Family: Carabidae
- Genus: Anthia
- Species: A. hedenborgi

Binomial name
- Anthia hedenborgi Boheman, 1848

Species of beetle

Anthia hedenborgi is a species of ground beetle in the subfamily Anthiinae. It was described by Boheman in 1848.
