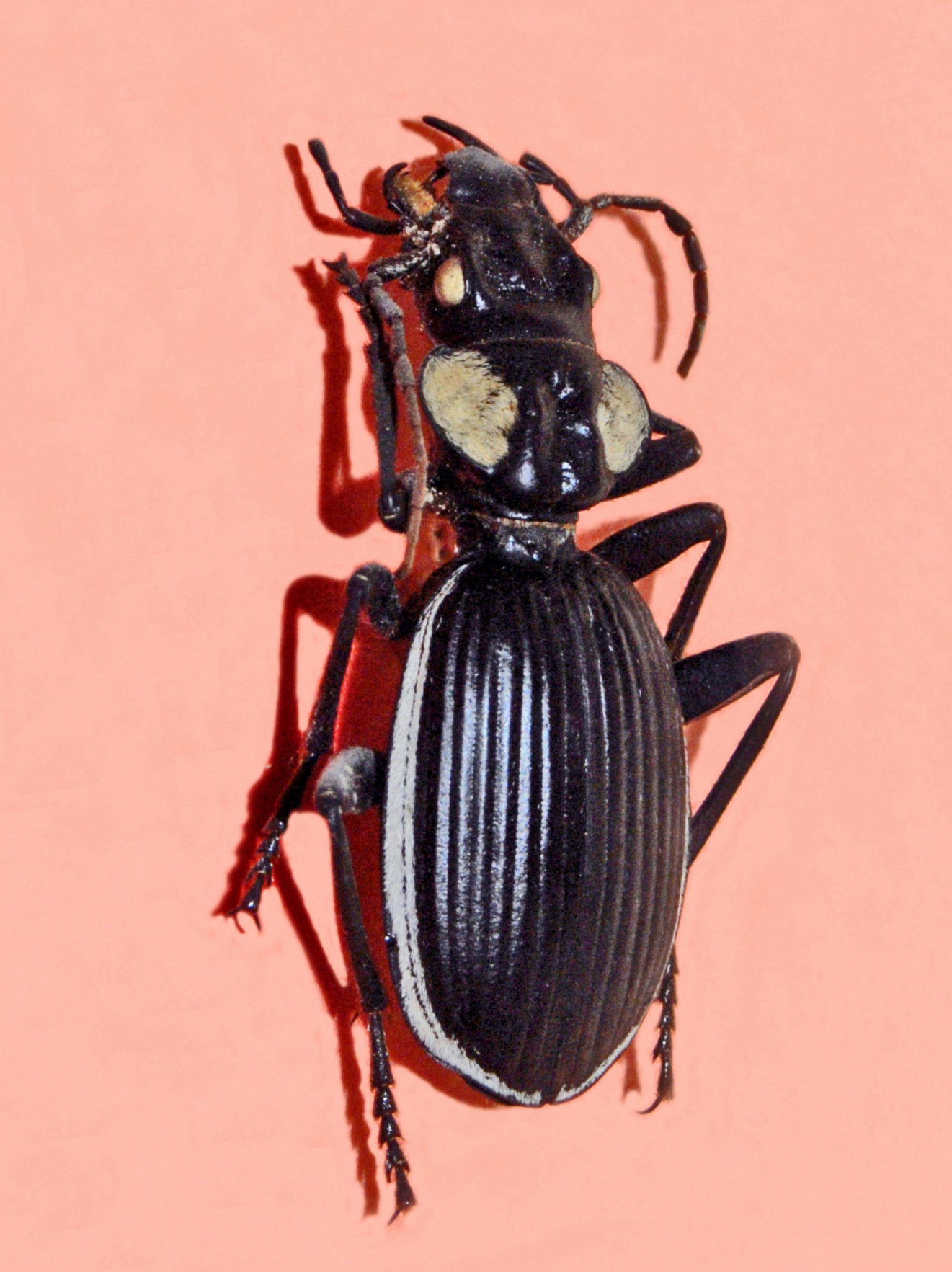
- Museum specimen of Anthia thoracica

Scientific classification
- Kingdom: Animalia
- Phylum: Arthropoda
- Clade: Pancrustacea
- Class: Insecta
- Order: Coleoptera
- Suborder: Adephaga
- Family: Carabidae
- Genus: Anthia
- Species: A. thoracica

Binomial name
- Anthia thoracica (Thunberg, 1784)

Synonyms

= Anthia thoracica =

Species of beetle

Anthia thoracica, the two-spotted ground beetle, is a species of beetles of the family Carabidae.

== Description ==
Anthia thoracica can reach a length of about 47–53 millimetres (1.9–2.1 in). Body is black, with an ovate patch of yellowish setae on each lateral extension of the pronotum and a band of whitish reclinate setae on the lateral margins of elytra. Mandibles are strong and elongate in males. Pronotum has broad lateral flanges and elytra are ovate and smooth, with eight linear striae.

== Distribution ==
This species can be found in Namibia, Tanzania and South Africa.
