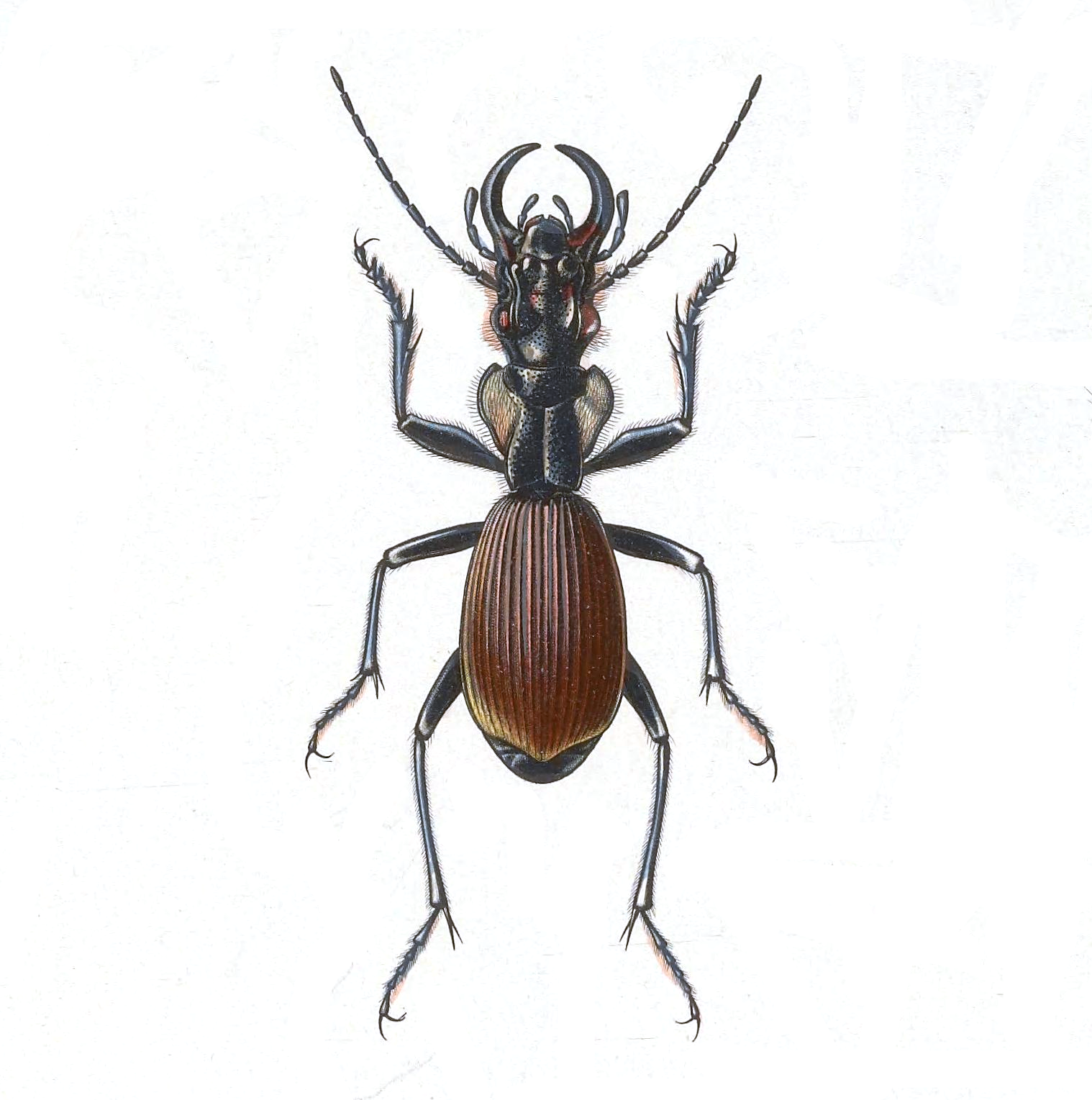

Scientific classification
- Kingdom: Animalia
- Phylum: Arthropoda
- Clade: Pancrustacea
- Class: Insecta
- Order: Coleoptera
- Suborder: Adephaga
- Family: Carabidae
- Genus: Anthia
- Species: A. lunae

Binomial name
- Anthia lunae J. Thomson, 1859

= Anthia lunae =

Species of beetle

Anthia lunae is a species of ground beetle in the subfamily Anthiinae. It was described by J. Thomson in 1859.
