= Anthia andersonii =

Scientific classification
- Kingdom: Animalia
- Phylum: Arthropoda
- Clade: Pancrustacea
- Class: Insecta
- Order: Coleoptera
- Suborder: Adephaga
- Superfamily: Caraboidea
- Family: Carabidae
- Subfamily: Anthiinae
- Genus: Anthia
- Species: A. andersonii

Binomial name
- Anthia andersonii Chaudoir, 1861

Species of beetle

Anthia andersonii is a species in the beetle family Carabidae. It is found in Africa.

== Subspecies ==
These six subspecies belong to the species Anthia andersonii:

- Anthia andersonii alternocostata (Basilewsky in Maquret, 2017) (Democratic Republic of the Congo)
- Anthia andersonii andersonii Chaudoir, 1861 (Angola, Zimbabwe, Botswana, Namibia, and South Africa)
- Anthia andersonii bennigseni Sternberg, 1906 (Democratic Republic of the Congo and Angola)
- Anthia andersonii crudelis Harold, 1878 (Democratic Republic of the Congo and Angola)
- Anthia andersonii latelimbata (Basilewsky in Kleinfeld & Puchner, 2012) (Democratic Republic of the Congo)
- Anthia andersonii shabana (Basilewsky in Kleinfeld & Puchner, 2012) (Democratic Republic of the Congo)
