= Anthia orientalis =

Scientific classification
- Kingdom: Animalia
- Phylum: Arthropoda
- Clade: Pancrustacea
- Class: Insecta
- Order: Coleoptera
- Suborder: Adephaga
- Family: Carabidae
- Genus: Anthia
- Species: A. orientalis

Binomial name
- Anthia orientalis (Hope, 1838)

Species of beetle

Anthia orientalis is a species of ground beetle in the subfamily Anthiinae. It was described by Hope in 1838.
