= Anthia binotata =

Scientific classification
- Kingdom: Animalia
- Phylum: Arthropoda
- Clade: Pancrustacea
- Class: Insecta
- Order: Coleoptera
- Suborder: Adephaga
- Family: Carabidae
- Genus: Anthia
- Species: A. binotata

Binomial name
- Anthia binotata Perroud, 1846

Species of beetle

Anthia binotata is a species of ground beetle in the subfamily Anthiinae. It was described by Perroud in 1846.
