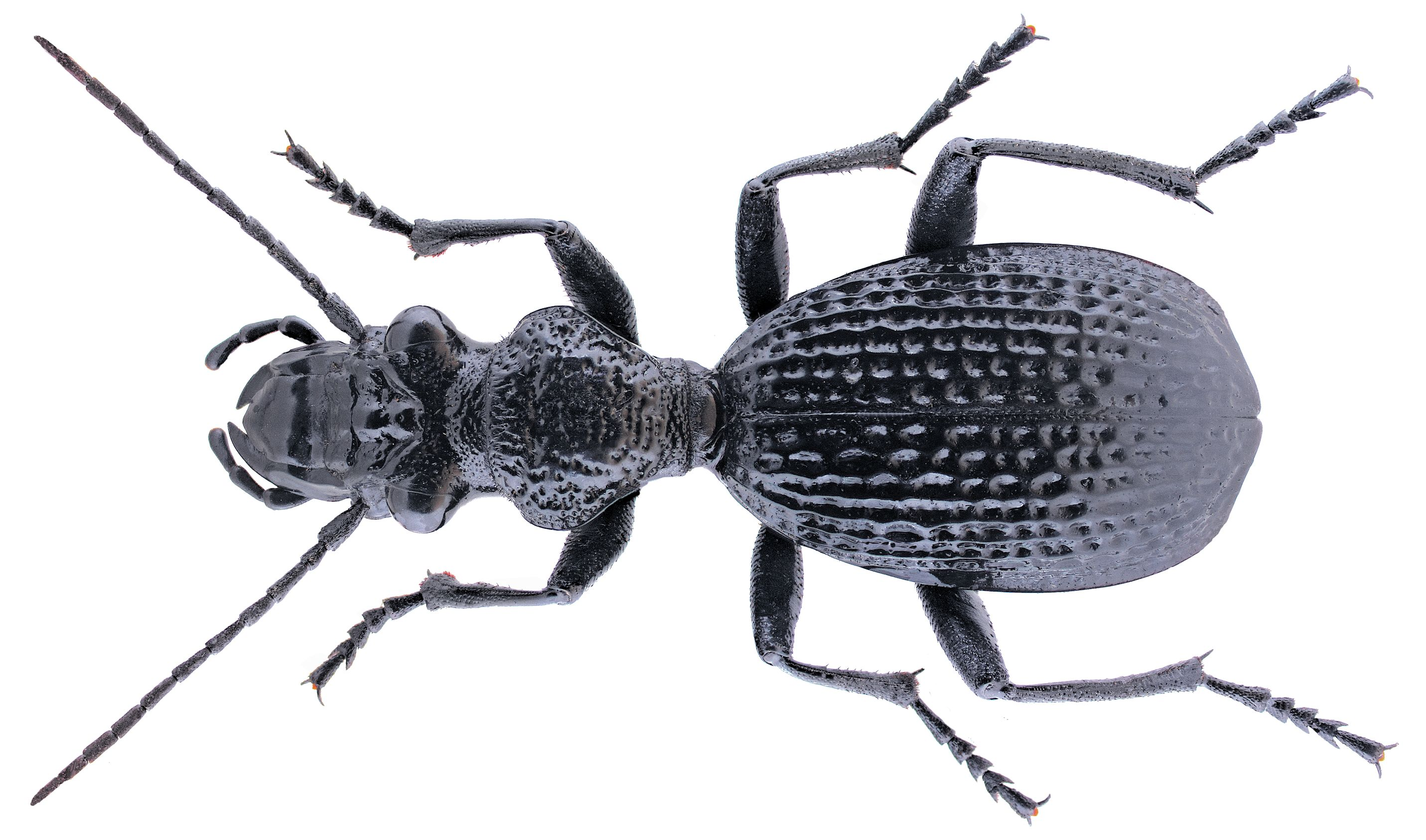

Scientific classification
- Kingdom: Animalia
- Phylum: Arthropoda
- Clade: Pancrustacea
- Class: Insecta
- Order: Coleoptera
- Suborder: Adephaga
- Family: Carabidae
- Genus: Anthia
- Species: A. cavernosa

Binomial name
- Anthia cavernosa Gerstaecker, 1866

= Anthia cavernosa =

Species of beetle

Anthia cavernosa is a species of ground beetle in the subfamily Anthiinae. It was described by Carl Eduard Adolph Gerstaecker in 1866.
