= Anthia biguttata =

Scientific classification
- Kingdom: Animalia
- Phylum: Arthropoda
- Clade: Pancrustacea
- Class: Insecta
- Order: Coleoptera
- Suborder: Adephaga
- Family: Carabidae
- Genus: Anthia
- Species: A. biguttata

Binomial name
- Anthia biguttata Bonelli, 1813

Synonyms
- Anthia costata

Species of beetle

Anthia biguttata is a species of ground beetle in the subfamily, Anthiinae. It was described by Bonelli in 1813.
