= Anthia prevoili =

Scientific classification
- Kingdom: Animalia
- Phylum: Arthropoda
- Clade: Pancrustacea
- Class: Insecta
- Order: Coleoptera
- Suborder: Adephaga
- Family: Carabidae
- Genus: Anthia
- Species: A. prevoili

Binomial name
- Anthia prevoili Lucas, 1881

Species of beetle

Anthia prevoili is a species of ground beetle in the subfamily Anthiinae. It was described by Lucas in 1881.
