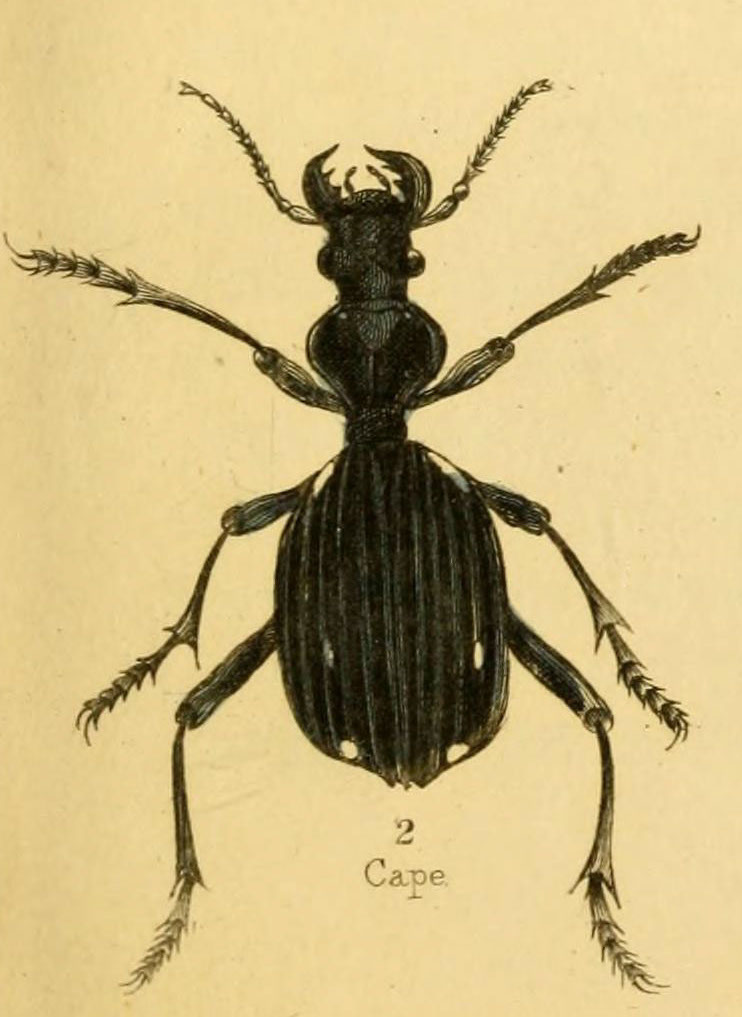

Scientific classification
- Kingdom: Animalia
- Phylum: Arthropoda
- Clade: Pancrustacea
- Class: Insecta
- Order: Coleoptera
- Suborder: Adephaga
- Family: Carabidae
- Genus: Anthia
- Species: A. decemguttata

Binomial name
- Anthia decemguttata (Linnaeus, 1764)

Synonyms
- Thermophilum decemguttatum

= Anthia decemguttata =

Species of beetle

Anthia decemguttata is a species of ground beetle in the subfamily Anthiinae. It was described by Carl Linnaeus in 1764.
