= Anthia circumscripta =

Scientific classification
- Kingdom: Animalia
- Phylum: Arthropoda
- Clade: Pancrustacea
- Class: Insecta
- Order: Coleoptera
- Suborder: Adephaga
- Family: Carabidae
- Genus: Anthia
- Species: A. circumscripta

Binomial name
- Anthia circumscripta Klug, 1853

Species of beetle

Anthia circumscripta is a species of ground beetle in the subfamily Anthiinae. It was described by Johann Christoph Friedrich Klug in 1853.
