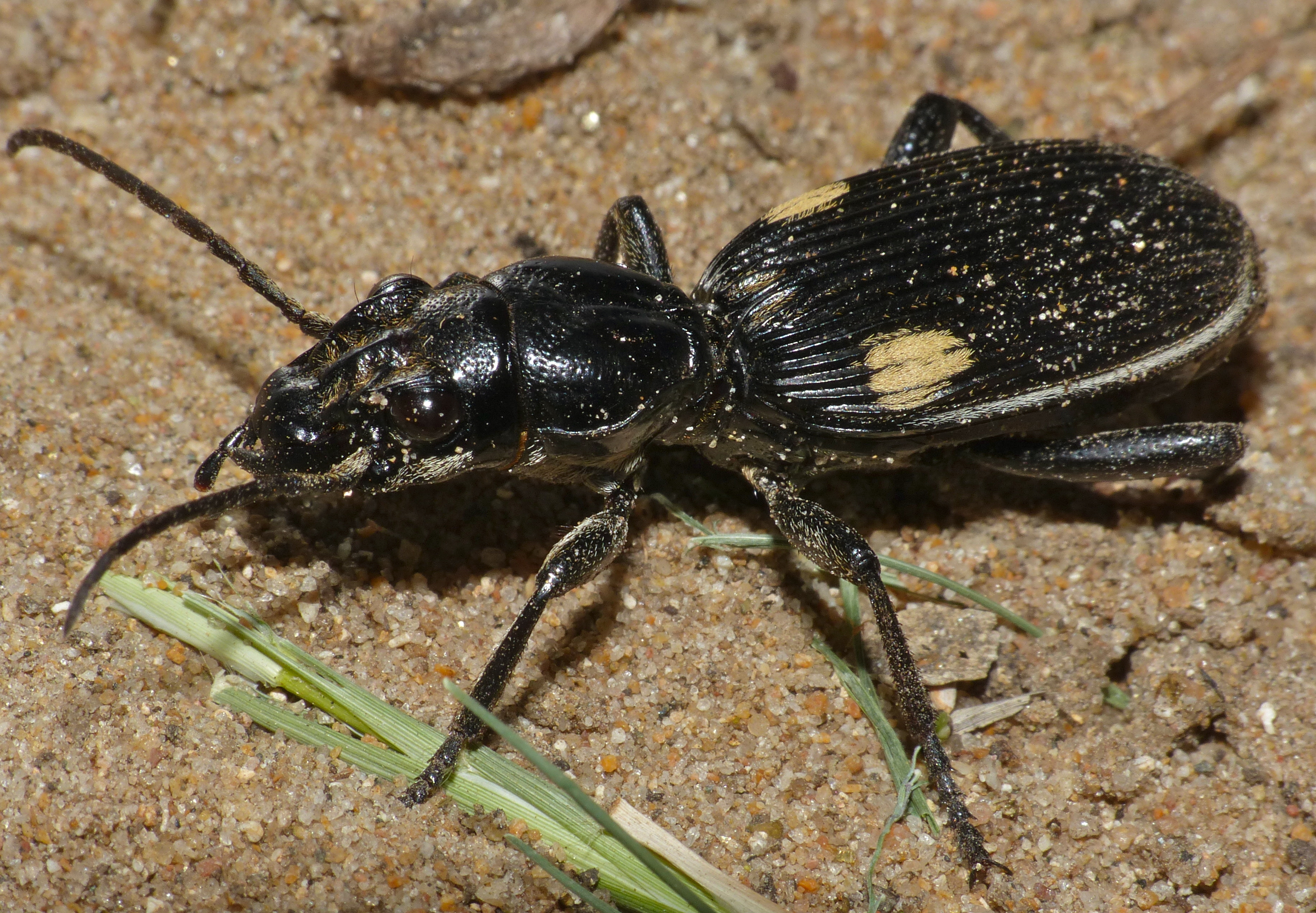

Scientific classification
- Kingdom: Animalia
- Phylum: Arthropoda
- Clade: Pancrustacea
- Class: Insecta
- Order: Coleoptera
- Suborder: Adephaga
- Family: Carabidae
- Genus: Anthia
- Species: A. aequilatera

Binomial name
- Anthia aequilatera Klug, 1853

= Anthia aequilatera =

Species of beetle

Anthia aequilatera is a species of ground beetle in the subfamily Anthiinae found in South Africa. It was described by Johann Christoph Friedrich Klug in 1853.
