= Anthia capillata =

Scientific classification
- Kingdom: Animalia
- Phylum: Arthropoda
- Clade: Pancrustacea
- Class: Insecta
- Order: Coleoptera
- Suborder: Adephaga
- Family: Carabidae
- Genus: Anthia
- Species: A. capillata

Binomial name
- Anthia capillata Obst, 1901

Species of beetle

Anthia capillata is a species of ground beetle in the subfamily Anthiinae. It was described by Obst in 1901.
