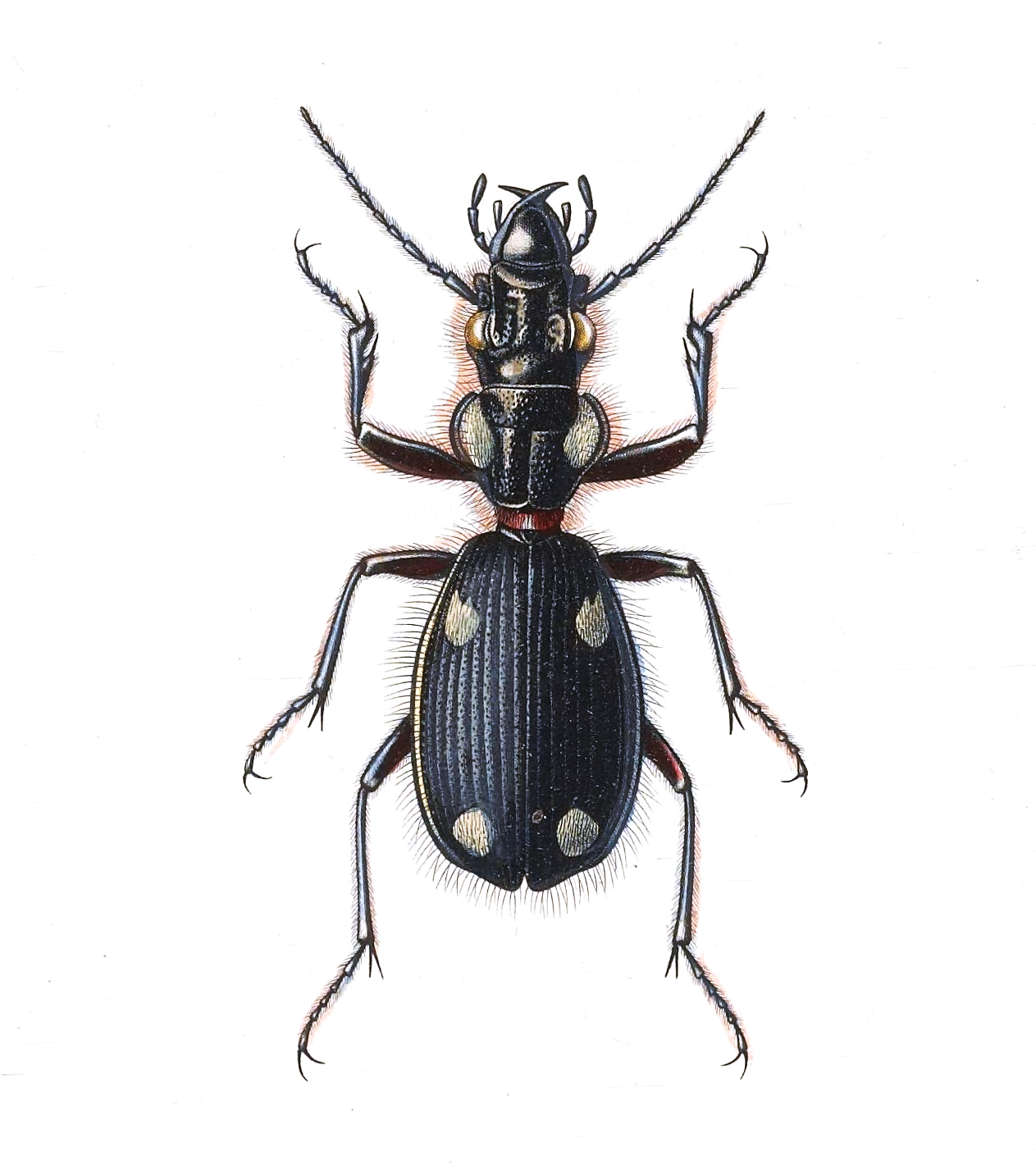

Scientific classification
- Kingdom: Animalia
- Phylum: Arthropoda
- Clade: Pancrustacea
- Class: Insecta
- Order: Coleoptera
- Suborder: Adephaga
- Family: Carabidae
- Genus: Anthia
- Species: A. ferox

Binomial name
- Anthia ferox J. Thompson, 1859

= Anthia ferox =

Species of beetle

Anthia ferox is a species of ground beetle in the subfamily Anthiinae. It was described by J. Thompson in 1859. It is found in northern Africa in Ethiopia and Sudan.
