= Anthia artemis =

Scientific classification
- Kingdom: Animalia
- Phylum: Arthropoda
- Clade: Pancrustacea
- Class: Insecta
- Order: Coleoptera
- Suborder: Adephaga
- Family: Carabidae
- Genus: Anthia
- Species: A. artemis

Binomial name
- Anthia artemis Gerstaecker, 1884

Species of beetle

Anthia artemis is a species of ground beetle in the subfamily Anthiinae. It was described by Carl Eduard Adolph Gerstaecker in 1884. The insect was originally found in Tanzania. In 1992 it was identified in Kenya.
