= Anthia pulcherrima =

Scientific classification
- Kingdom: Animalia
- Phylum: Arthropoda
- Clade: Pancrustacea
- Class: Insecta
- Order: Coleoptera
- Suborder: Adephaga
- Family: Carabidae
- Genus: Anthia
- Species: A. pulcherrima

Binomial name
- Anthia pulcherrima H. W. Bates, 1888

Species of beetle

Anthia pulcherrima is a species of ground beetle in the subfamily Anthiinae. It was described by Henry Walter Bates in 1888.
