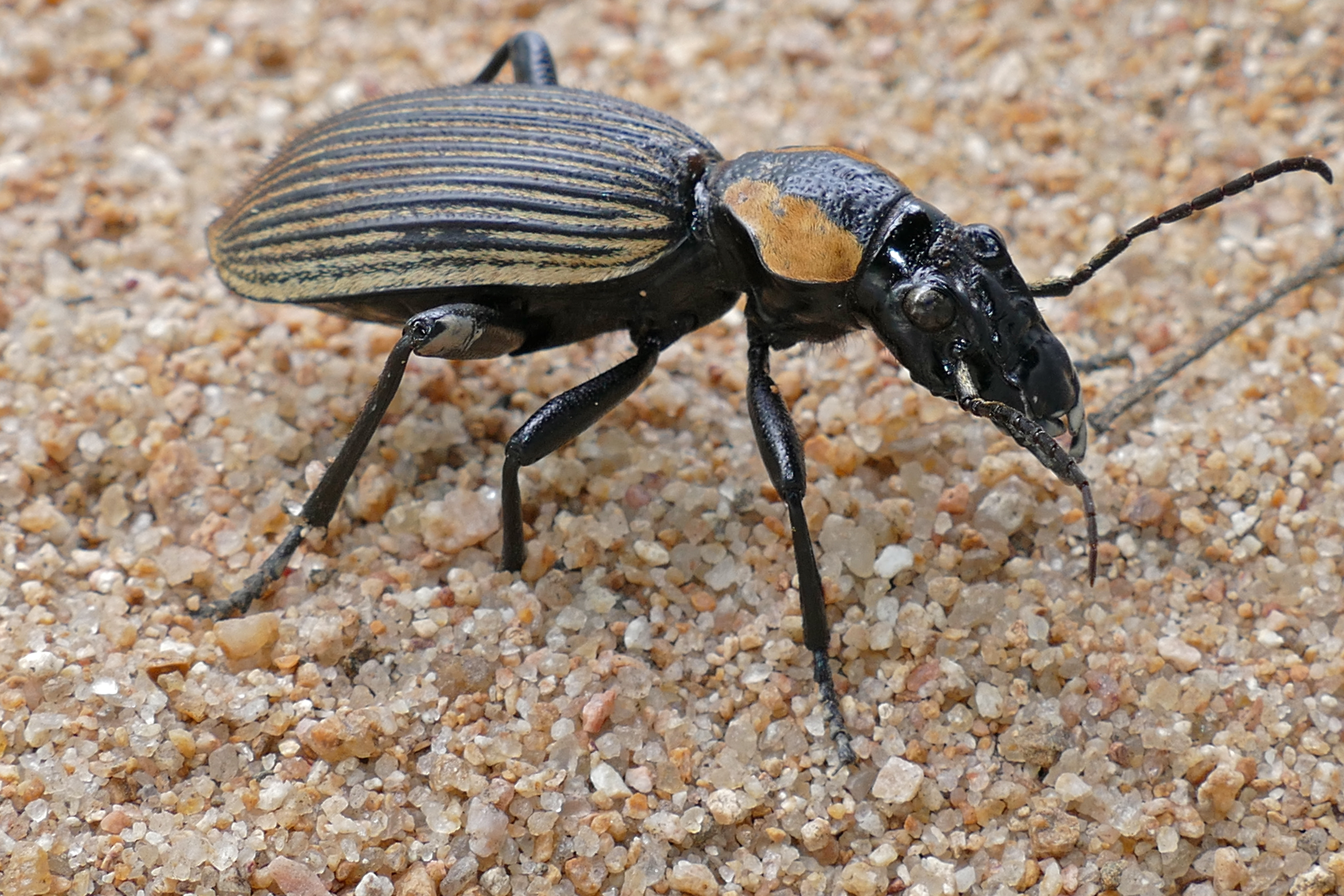

Scientific classification
- Kingdom: Animalia
- Phylum: Arthropoda
- Clade: Pancrustacea
- Class: Insecta
- Order: Coleoptera
- Suborder: Adephaga
- Family: Carabidae
- Genus: Anthia
- Species: A. burchelli

Binomial name
- Anthia burchelli Hope, 1832

= Anthia burchelli =

Species of beetle

Anthia burchelli also known as the Burchell's saber-toothed ground beetle is a species of ground beetle in the subfamily Anthiinae. It was described by Hope in 1832.
