= Anthia lefebvrei =

Scientific classification
- Kingdom: Animalia
- Phylum: Arthropoda
- Clade: Pancrustacea
- Class: Insecta
- Order: Coleoptera
- Suborder: Adephaga
- Family: Carabidae
- Genus: Anthia
- Species: A. lefebvrei

Binomial name
- Anthia lefebvrei Guérin-Méneville, 1849

Species of beetle

Anthia lefebvrei is a species of ground beetle in the subfamily Anthiinae. It was described by Félix Édouard Guérin-Méneville in 1849.
