= Anthia tatumana =

Scientific classification
- Kingdom: Animalia
- Phylum: Arthropoda
- Clade: Pancrustacea
- Class: Insecta
- Order: Coleoptera
- Suborder: Adephaga
- Family: Carabidae
- Genus: Anthia
- Species: A. tatumana

Binomial name
- Anthia tatumana White, 1846

Species of beetle

Anthia tatumana is a species of ground beetle in the subfamily Anthiinae. It was described by the zoologist Adam White in 1846.

This species is about one inch long and resembles both Anthia Caillaudii and Cypholoba macilenta. It is black with a white stripe (called a vitta) extending from the head to the elytra, where there are two white lunulated spots. It is named after Thomas Tatum of St George’s Hospital.

This species is also sometimes categorized as being in the genus Cypholoba instead of the genus Anthia.
