= Anthia limbata =

Scientific classification
- Kingdom: Animalia
- Phylum: Arthropoda
- Clade: Pancrustacea
- Class: Insecta
- Order: Coleoptera
- Suborder: Adephaga
- Family: Carabidae
- Genus: Anthia
- Species: A. limbata

Binomial name
- Anthia limbata Dejean, 1831

Species of beetle

Anthia limbata is a species of ground beetle in the subfamily Anthiinae. It was described by Pierre François Marie Auguste Dejean in 1831.
