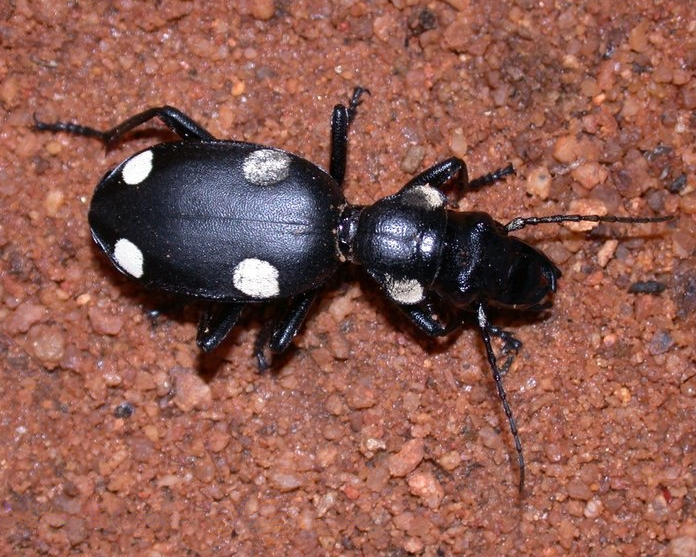

Scientific classification
- Kingdom: Animalia
- Phylum: Arthropoda
- Clade: Pancrustacea
- Class: Insecta
- Order: Coleoptera
- Suborder: Adephaga
- Family: Carabidae
- Genus: Anthia
- Species: A. sexguttata

Binomial name
- Anthia sexguttata (Fabricius, 1775)

= Anthia sexguttata =

Species of beetle

Anthia sexguttata, referred to commonly as the six-spot ground beetle, is a beetle of the family Carabidae.

== Appearance ==
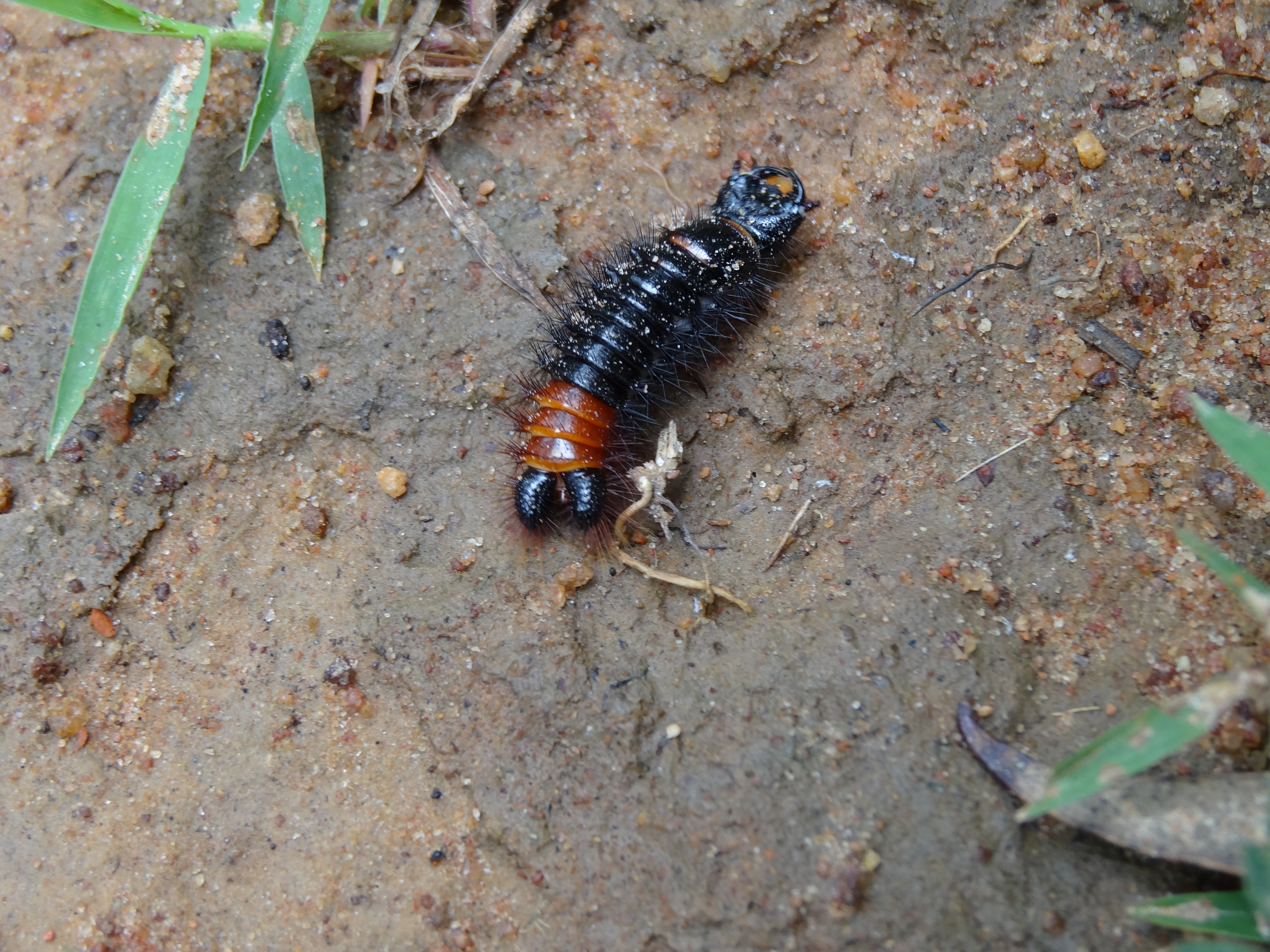
Larva

Adults measure approximately 4 cm (1.5 inches), are black with six relatively large, white, dorsal spots (four over the elytra and two on the thorax). Other patterns are possible although the pattern is always symmetrical.

The larva has a flattened form, a large head capsule, and prominent mandibles.

== Distribution ==
The species occurs in the drier parts of South Asia. It is found in a variety of habitats including natural forests and dry scrubland. The species was found in a variety of human-modified habitats including agriculture fields and urban parks.

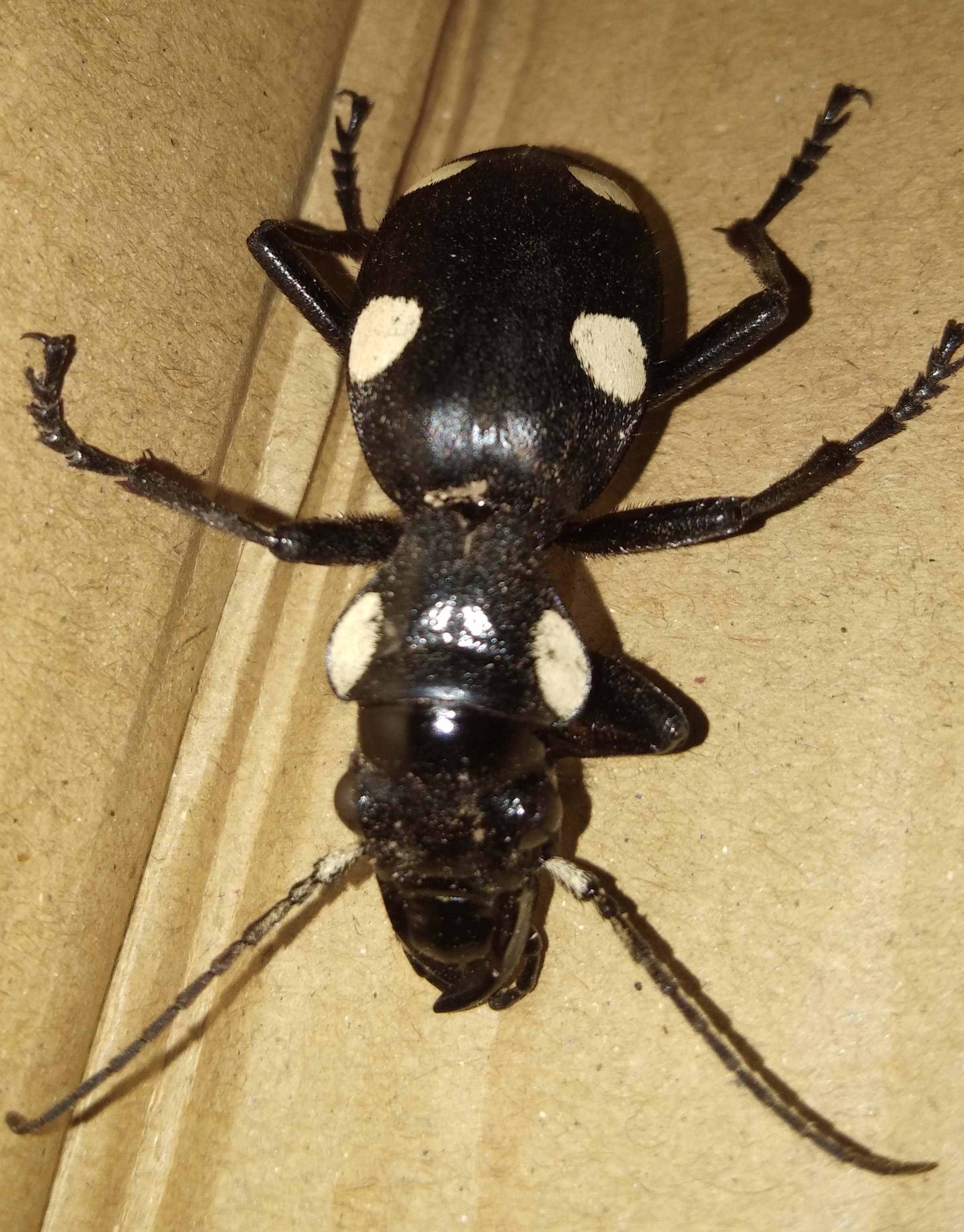
The Domino Beetle at Chittorgarh, Rajasthan, India

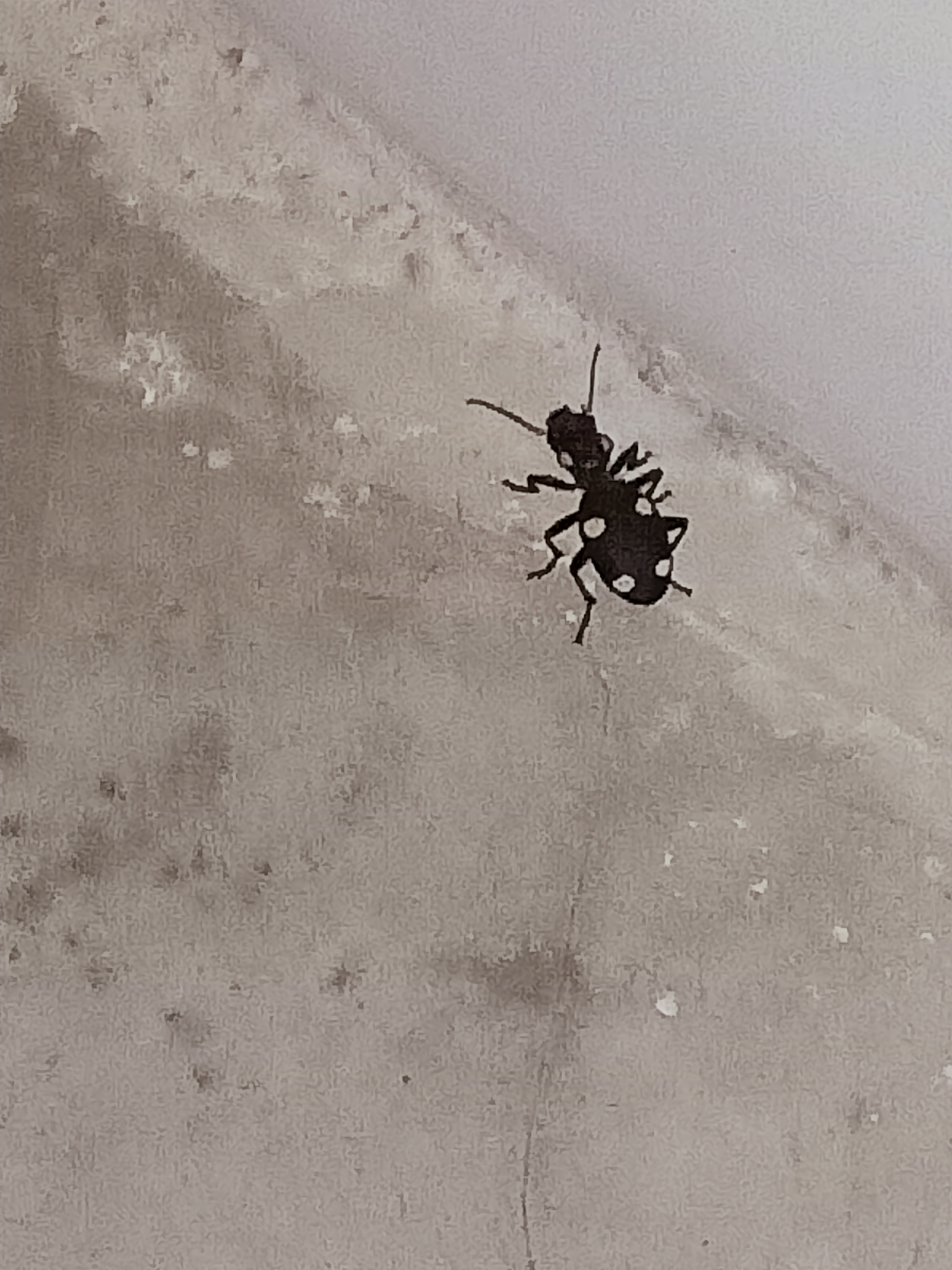
Domino Beetle encountered in Lucknow, Uttar Pradesh, India

== Diet ==
Adult A. sexguttata feed on other insects and snails. They are also predators on defoliating pests of Tectona grandis, such as Pyrausta machaeralis and Hyblaea puera. It is also an important predator on beetle pests of sugarcane crops.

== Ecology ==
A. sexguttata are well known predators of a number of pests of commercially important trees including Tectona grandis.

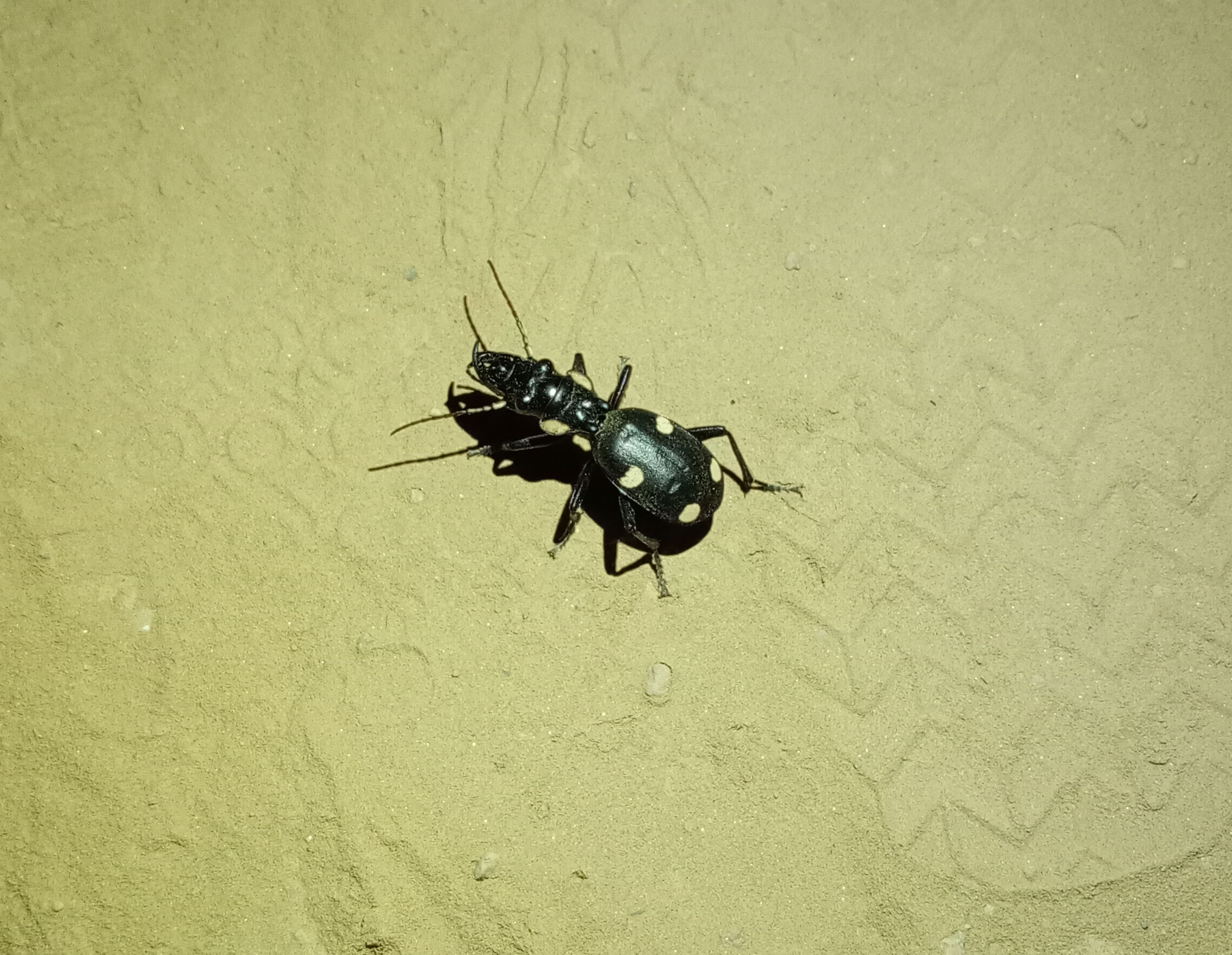
6 Spotted Ground Beetle (Anthia sexguttata) image captured in Central University of Punjab, Bathinda, India

The compound eyes of A. sexguttata exhibit sensitivity changes in a clear circadian rhythm, with both eyes being coupled when in total darkness.

The mite Regenpolipus madrasensis is described from A. sexguttata.
