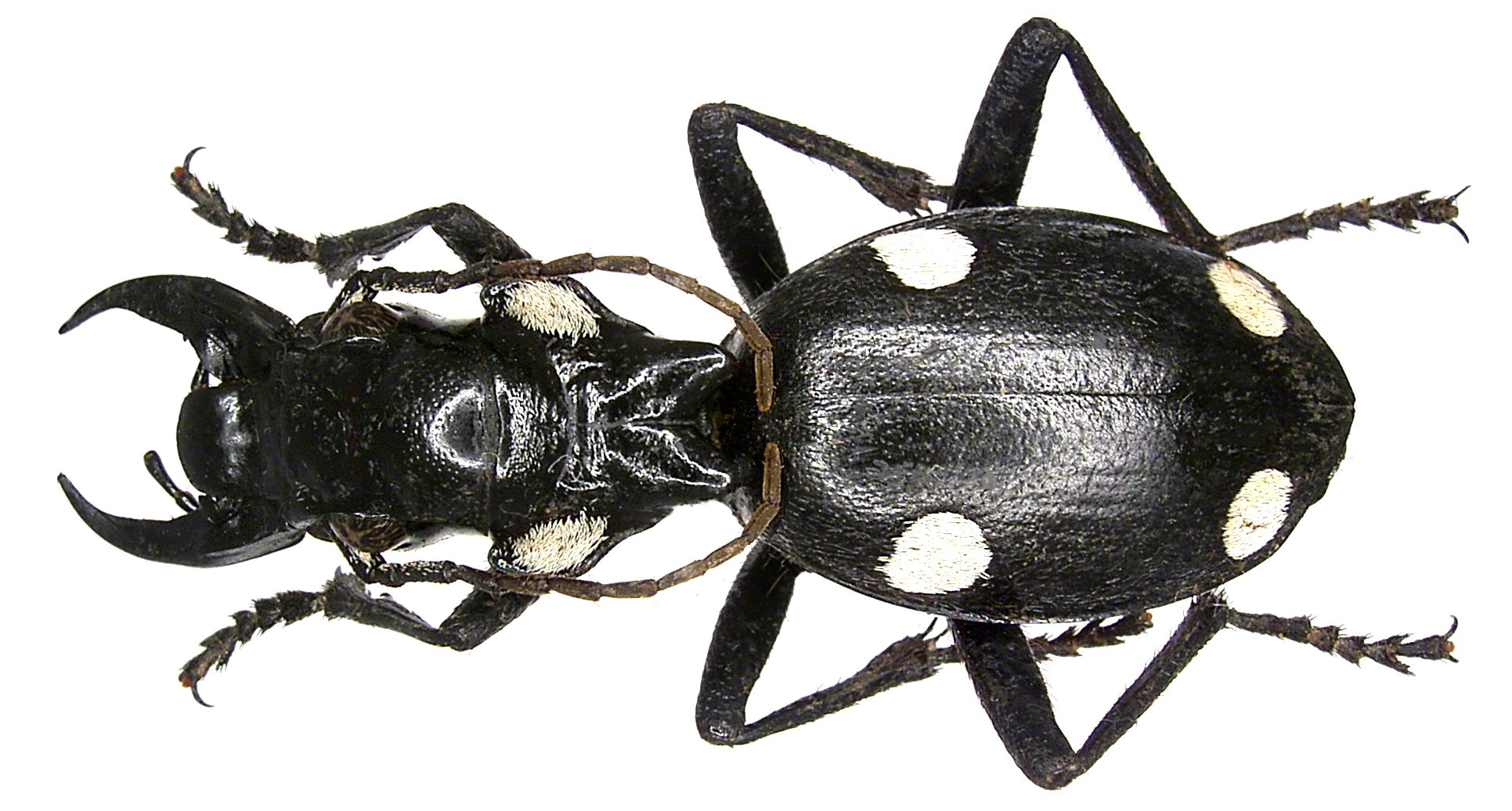

Scientific classification
- Kingdom: Animalia
- Phylum: Arthropoda
- Clade: Pancrustacea
- Class: Insecta
- Order: Coleoptera
- Suborder: Adephaga
- Superfamily: Caraboidea
- Family: Carabidae
- Subfamily: Anthiinae
- Genus: Anthia
- Species: A. mannerheimii

Binomial name
- Anthia mannerheimii Chaudoir, 1842

= Anthia mannerheimii =

Species of beetle

Anthia mannerheimii is a species in the beetle family Carabidae. It is found in Central, West and South Asia: Iran, Uzbekistan, Kazakhstan, Turkmenistan, Afghanistan, Pakistan, India.

== Subspecies ==
These two subspecies belong to the species Anthia mannerheimii:

- Anthia mannerheimii afghana Anichtchenko, 2009 (Afghanistan and Pakistan)
- Anthia mannerheimii mannerheimii Chaudoir, 1842 (Iran, Uzbekistan, Kazakhstan, Turkmenistan, and India)
