= Anthia machadoi =

Scientific classification
- Kingdom: Animalia
- Phylum: Arthropoda
- Clade: Pancrustacea
- Class: Insecta
- Order: Coleoptera
- Suborder: Adephaga
- Family: Carabidae
- Genus: Anthia
- Species: A. machadoi

Binomial name
- Anthia machadoi (Basilewsky, 1955)

Species of beetle

Anthia machadoi is a species of ground beetle in the subfamily Anthiinae. It was described by Basilewsky in 1955.
