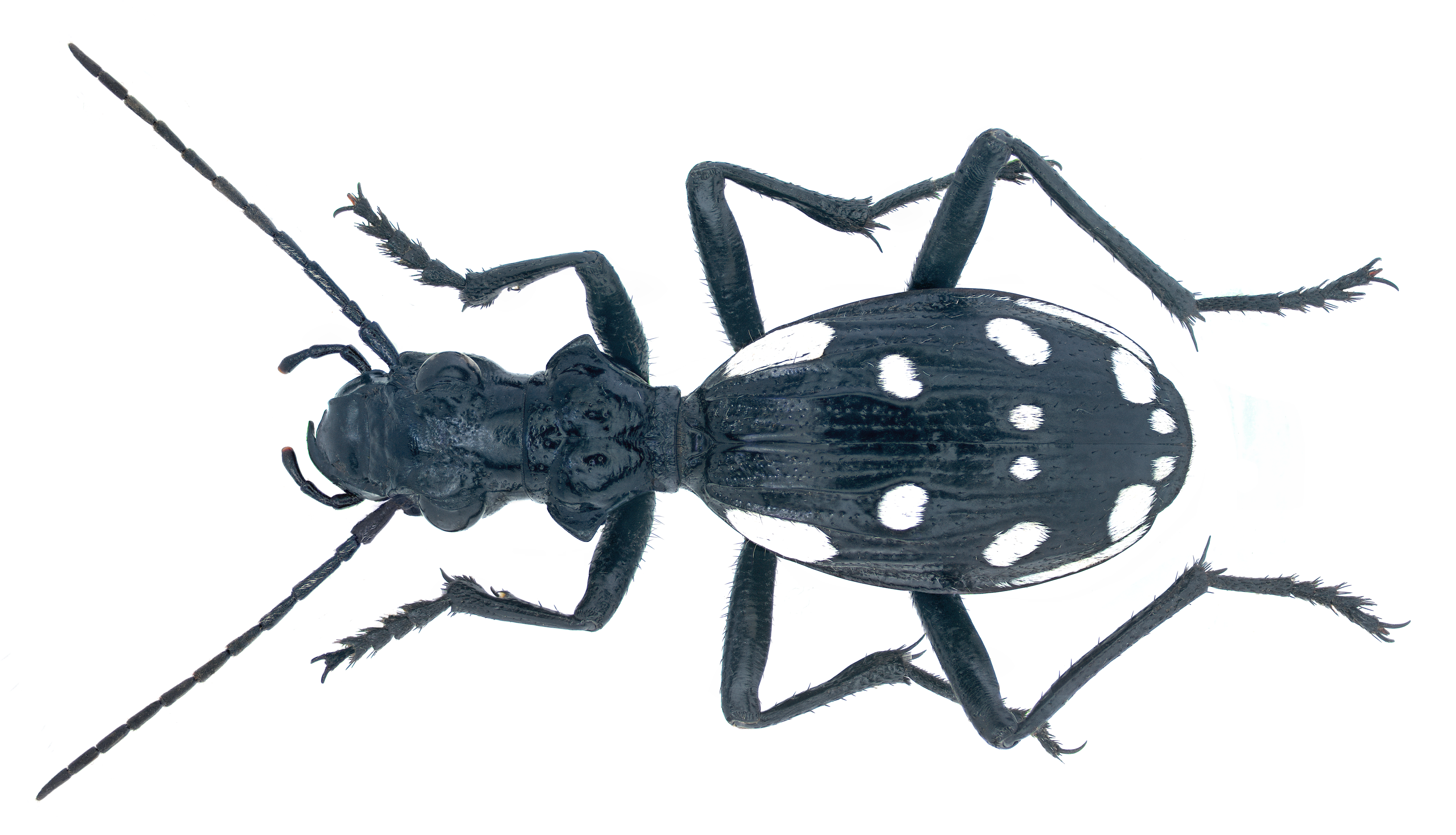

Scientific classification
- Kingdom: Animalia
- Phylum: Arthropoda
- Clade: Pancrustacea
- Class: Insecta
- Order: Coleoptera
- Suborder: Adephaga
- Family: Carabidae
- Genus: Anthia
- Species: A. duodecimguttata

Binomial name
- Anthia duodecimguttata Bonelli, 1813

= Anthia duodecimguttata =

Species of beetle

Anthia duodecimguttata is a species of ground beetle in the subfamily Anthiinae. It was described by Bonelli in 1813.
