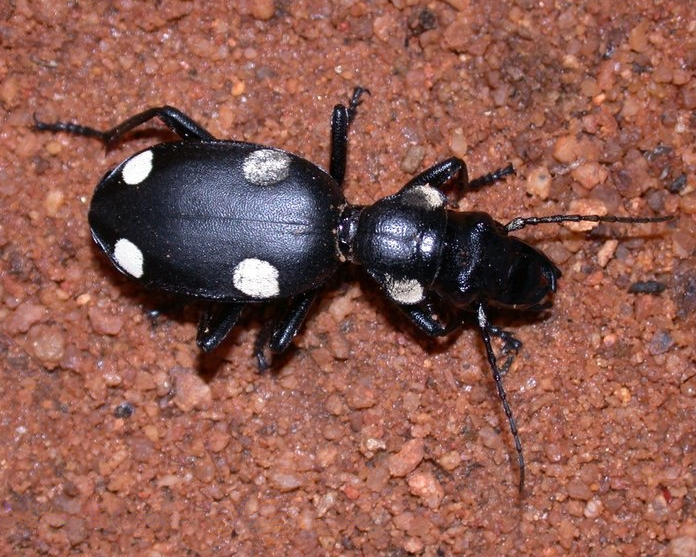
- Anthia sexguttata

Scientific classification
- Kingdom: Animalia
- Phylum: Arthropoda
- Clade: Pancrustacea
- Class: Insecta
- Order: Coleoptera
- Suborder: Adephaga
- Family: Carabidae
- Subfamily: Anthiinae
- Genus: Anthia; Weber, 1801

= Anthia =

Genus of beetles

Anthia (common name saber-toothed ground beetles) is a genus of the ground beetle family (Carabidae) from Africa and Asia. Species of Anthia can spray a jet of formic acid up to 30 centimetres (12 in), which, if not treated, can cause blindness in animals that harass the beetles.

In general, the beetles are large, armored and fast-moving, with prominent, powerful and sharp mandibles. Some are diurnal predators in semi-arid habitats, while others are nocturnal.

The genus is one of a group of similar taxa of predatory Carabidae that has been the subject of considerable nomenclatural confusion. Several species here and elsewhere included within the genus Anthia are occasionally referred to as belonging to the non-existent genus Thermophilum (e.g. Anthia fornasinii referred to as Thermophilum fornasinii), because the spelling has experienced a range of errors; the spelling that is valid under the ICZN and currently accepted is Termophilum but Thermophilum (an unjustified emendation of Termophilum) and Thermophila (a junior homonym of a valid genus name in the order Lepidoptera) have been variously used in the past, as well as the misspelling "Thermophilium".

== Species ==
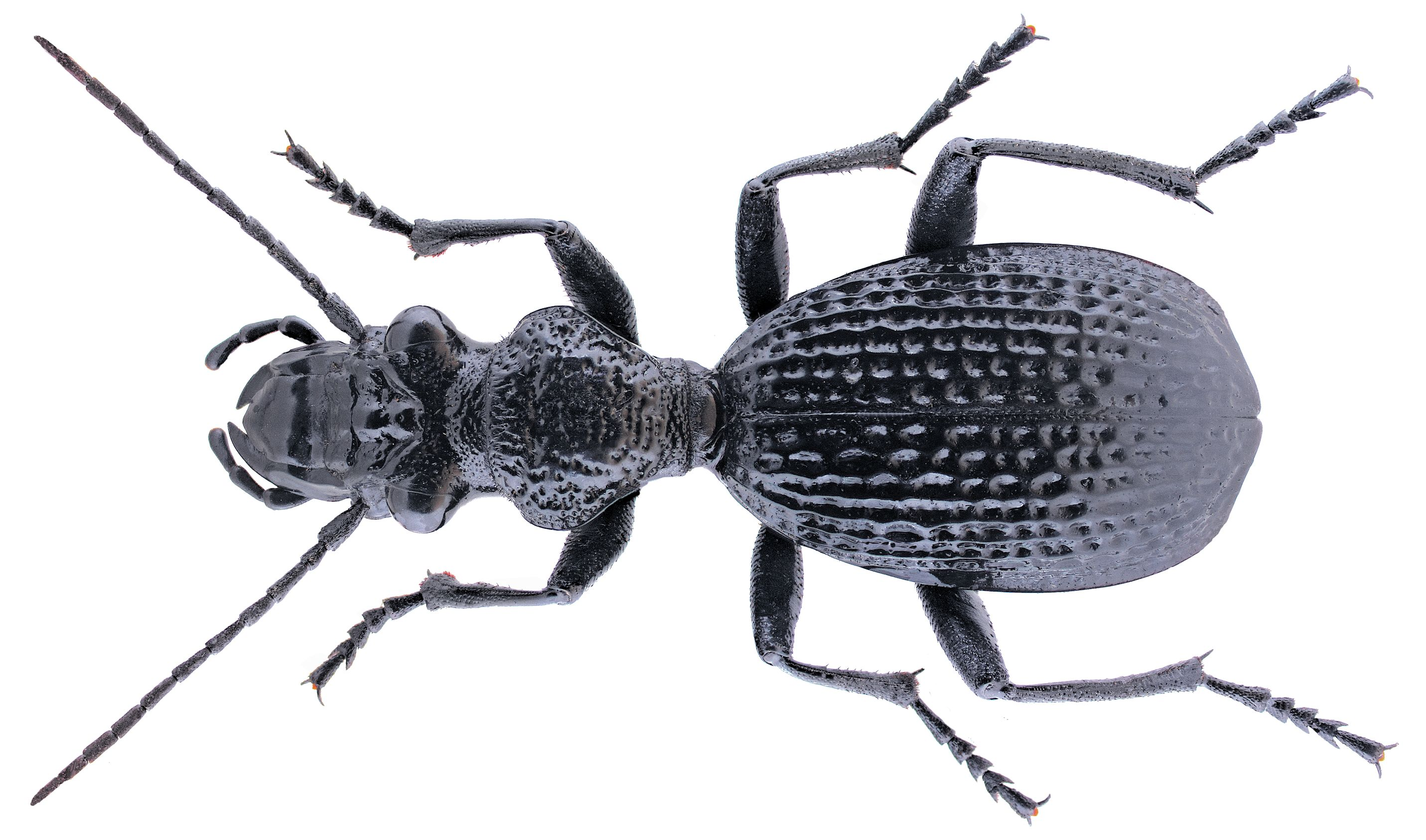
Anthia cavernosa

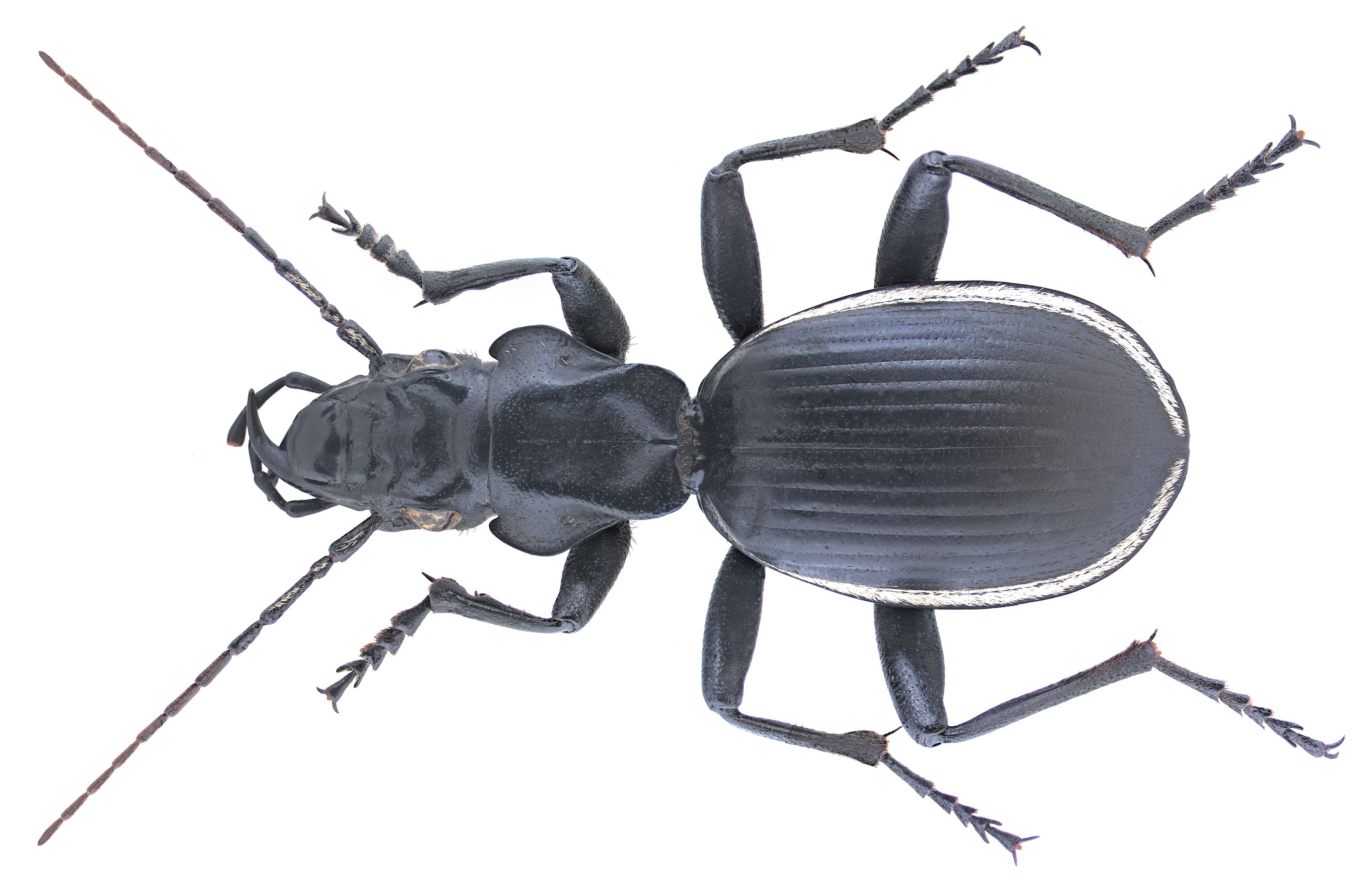
Anthia cinctipennis

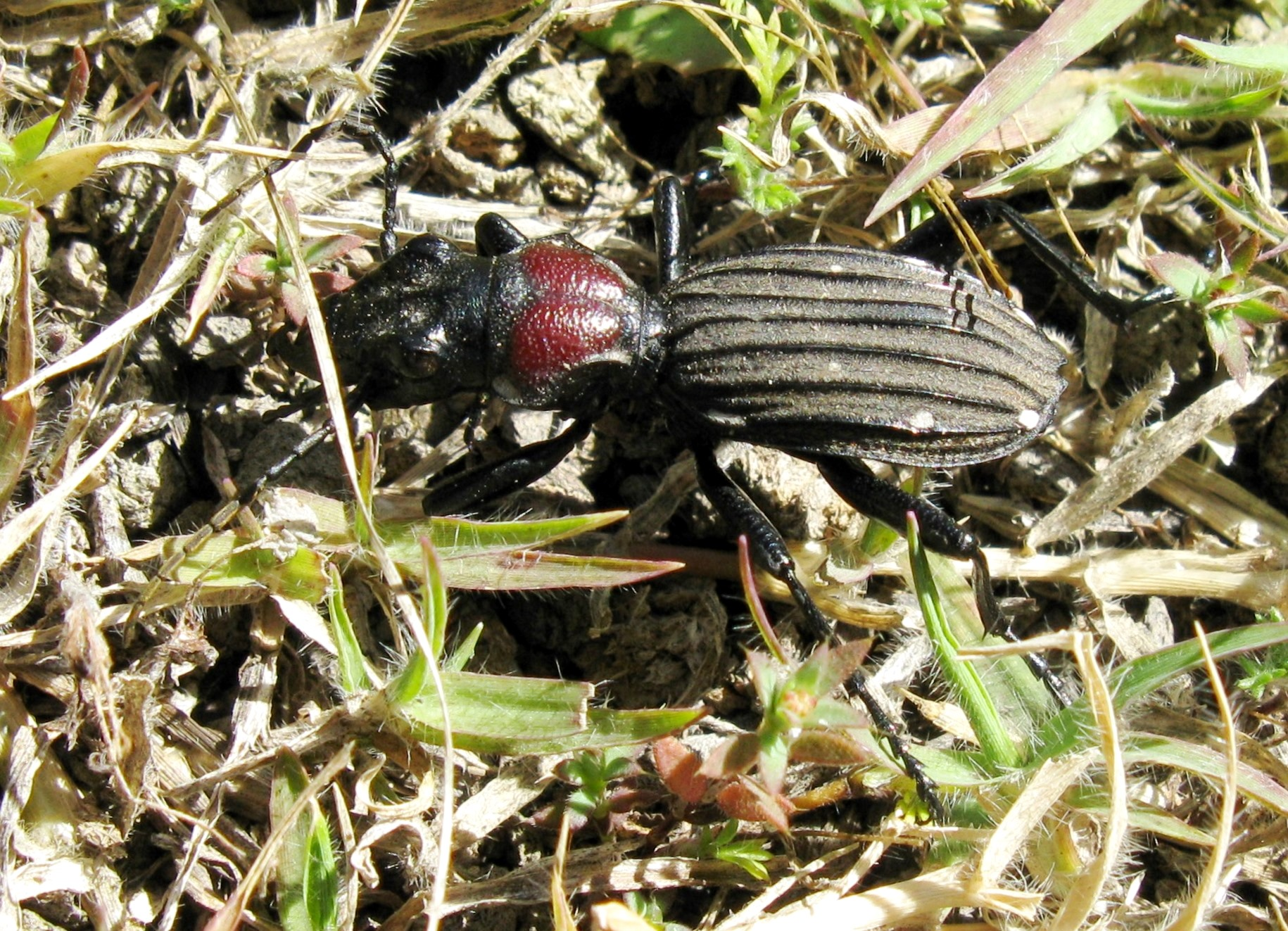
Anthia decemguttata

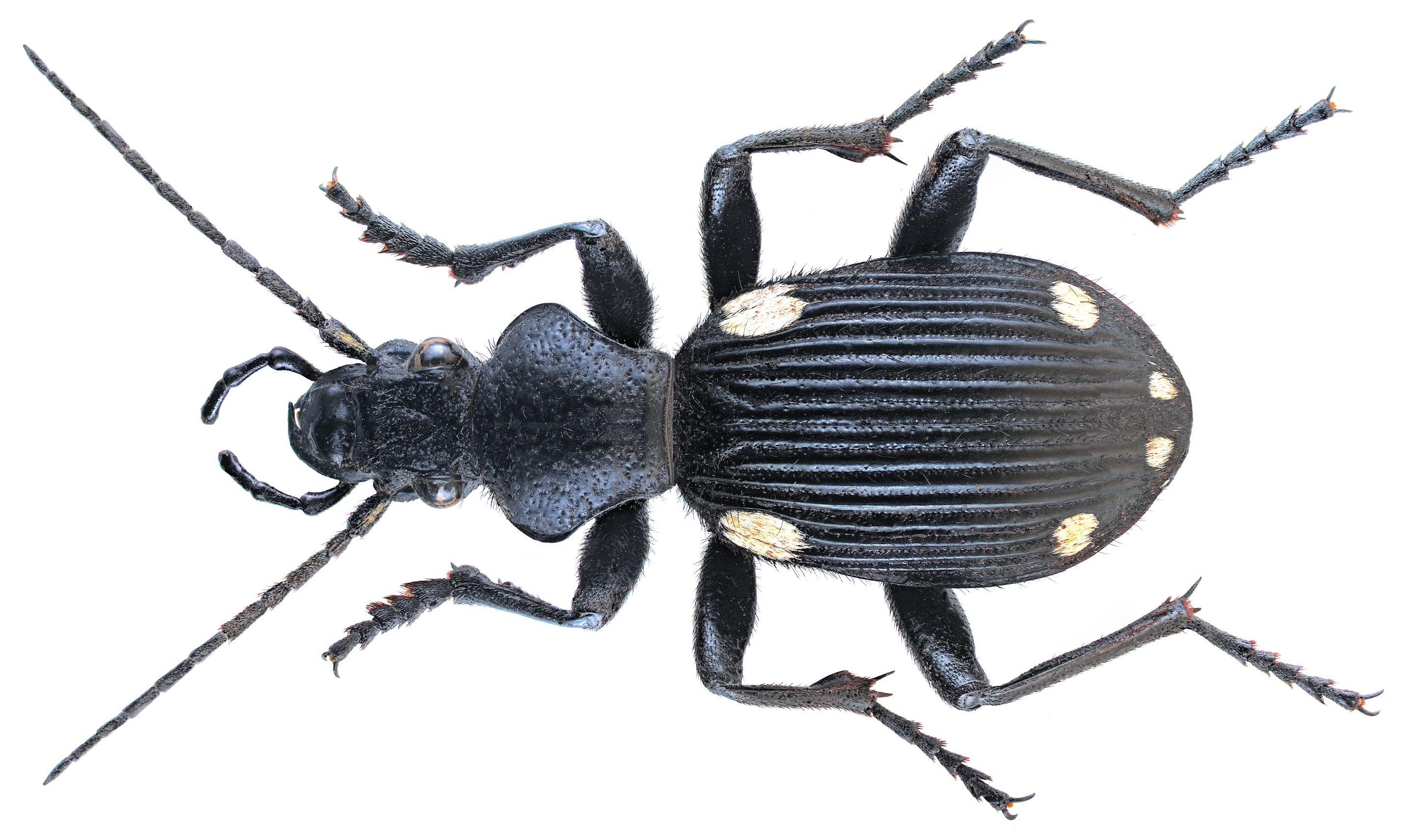
Anthia hexasticta

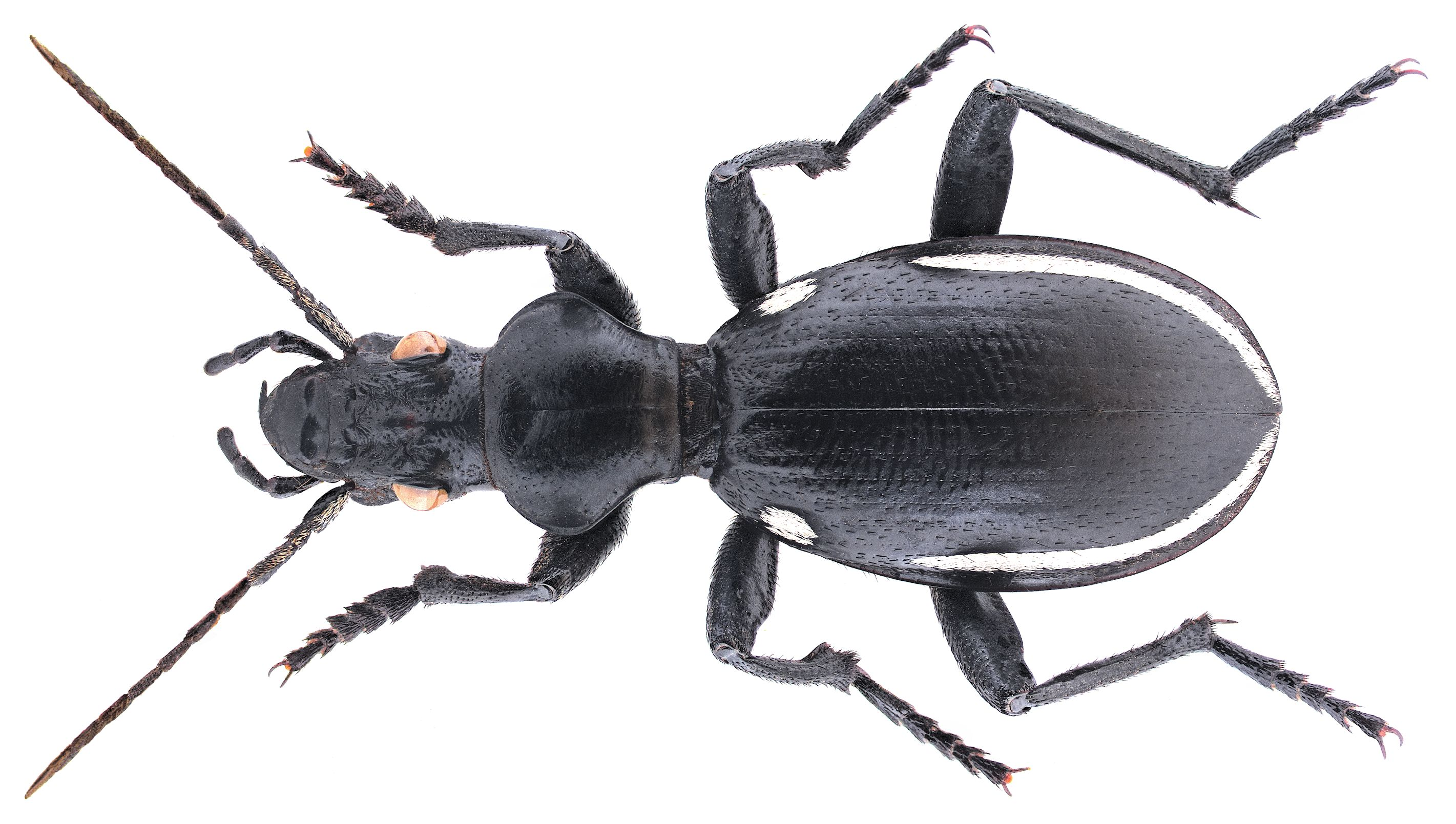
Anthia omoplata

The genus Anthia includes the following species:

- Anthia aemiliana Dohrn, 1881
- Anthia aequilatera Klug, 1853
- Anthia alternata Bates, 1978
- Anthia andersoni Chaudoir, 1861
- Anthia artemis Gerstaecker, 1884
- Anthia babaulti Benard, 1921
- Anthia biguttata Bonelli, 1813
- Anthia binotata Perroud, 1846
- Anthia brevivittata Obst, 1901
- Anthia bucolica Kolbe, 1894
- Anthia burchelli Hope, 1832
- Anthia calida Harold, 1878
- Anthia calva Sternberg, 1907
- Anthia capillata Obst, 1901
- Anthia cavernosa Gerstaecker, 1866
- Anthia cephalotes Guerin-Meneville, 1845
- Anthia cinctipennis Lequien, 1832
- Anthia circumscripta Klug, 1853
- Anthia costata Gory, 1836
- Anthia csikii Obst, 1906
- Anthia decemguttata (Linnaeus, 1764)
- Anthia discedens Sternberg, 1907
- Anthia duodecimguttata Bonelli, 1813
- Anthia ferox J. Thomson, 1859
- Anthia fornasinii Bertoloni, 1845
- Anthia galla J. Thomson, 1859
- Anthia hedenborgi Boheman, 1848
- Anthia hexasticta Gerstaecker, 1866
- Anthia ida Kolbe, 1894
- Anthia lefebvrei Guerin-Meneville, 1849
- Anthia limbata Dejean, 1831
- Anthia lunae J. Thomson, 1859
- Anthia machadoi (Basilewsky, 1955)
- Anthia mannerheimi Chaudoir, 1842
- Anthia massilicata Guerin-Meneville, 1845
- Anthia maxillosa (Fabricius, 1793)
- Anthia mima Peringuey, 1896
- Anthia mirabilis Sternberg, 1906
- Anthia namaqua Peringuey, 1896
- Anthia nimrod (Fabricius, 1793)
- Anthia oberthuri Obst, 1906
- Anthia omoplata Lequien, 1832
- Anthia ovampoa Peringuey, 1896
- Anthia orientalis (Hope, 1838)
- Anthia praesignis Bates, 1888
- Anthia prevoili Lucas, 1881
- Anthia principalis Sternberg, 1907
- Anthia pulcherrima H. W. Bates, 1888
- Anthia sexguttata Fabricius, 1775
- Anthia sexmaculata Fabricius, 1787
- Anthia sulcata (Fabricius, 1793)
- Anthia tatumana White, 1846
- Anthia thoracica (Thunberg, 1784)
- Anthia venator (Fabricius, 1792)

== See also ==
- Heliobolus lugubris (bushveld lizard), a southern African lizard where juveniles mimic the toxic Anthia beetles to avoid predators
- Therea, a genus of cockroach where some species mimic the toxic Anthia beetles to avoid predators
