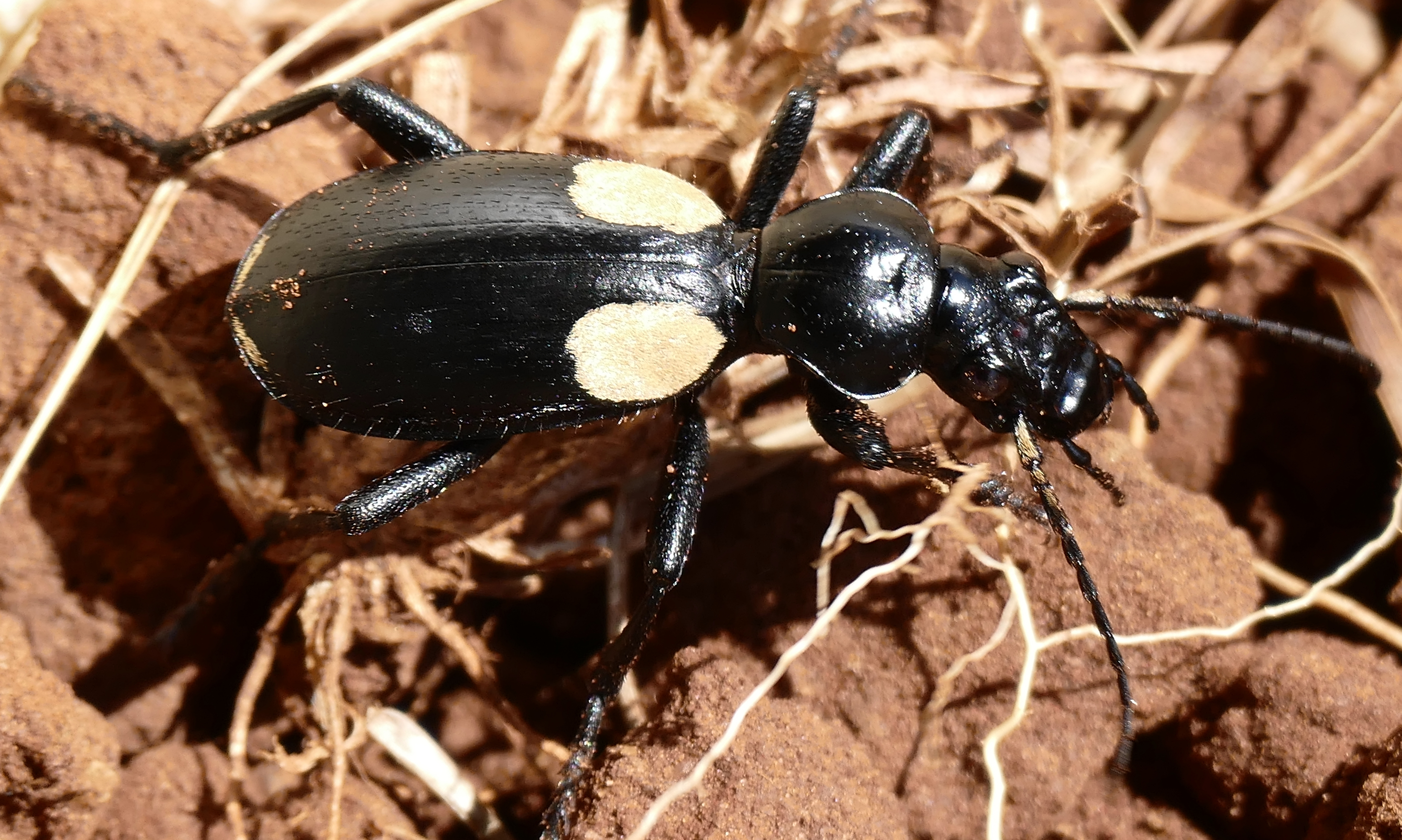

Scientific classification
- Kingdom: Animalia
- Phylum: Arthropoda
- Clade: Pancrustacea
- Class: Insecta
- Order: Coleoptera
- Suborder: Adephaga
- Family: Carabidae
- Subfamily: Anthiinae
- Genus: Anthia
- Species: A. homoplata

Binomial name
- Anthia homoplata Lequien, 1833

Synonyms
- Anthia omoplata; Termophilum homoplatum

= Anthia homoplata =

Species of beetle

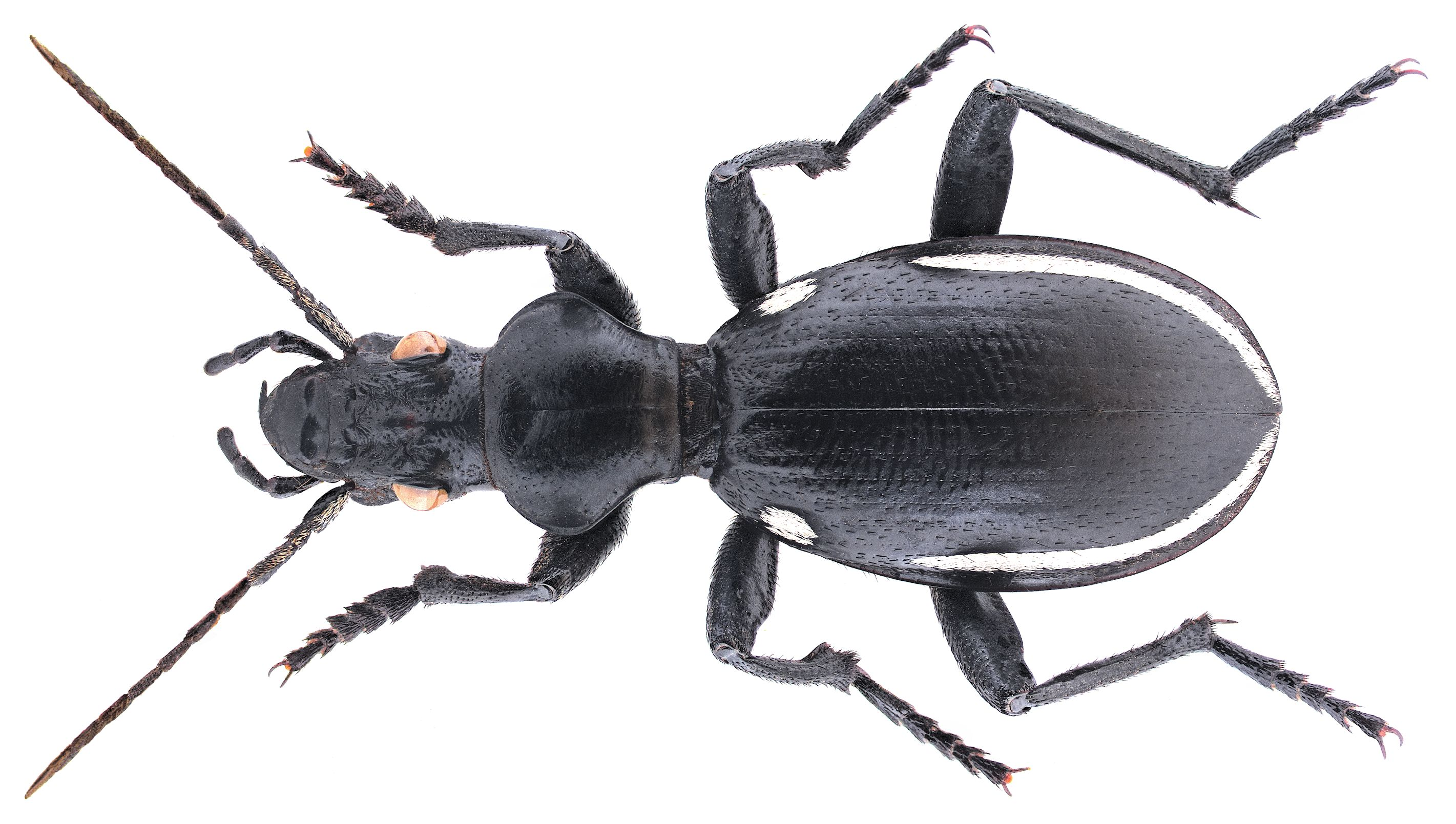

Anthia homoplata is a species in the beetle family Carabidae. It is found in Africa. Its size can range from five to six centimeters long. They eat other insects.

== Subspecies ==
These three subspecies belong to the species Anthia homoplata:

- Anthia homoplata homoplata Lequien, 1833 (Angola, Zambia, Mozambique, Zimbabwe, Botswana, Namibia, and South Africa)
- Anthia homoplata parva Obst, 1901 (Tanzania, Malawi, and Mozambique)
- Anthia homoplata septentrionalis Lassalle, 2010 (Zambia)
