= Anthia massilicata =

Scientific classification
- Kingdom: Animalia
- Phylum: Arthropoda
- Clade: Pancrustacea
- Class: Insecta
- Order: Coleoptera
- Suborder: Adephaga
- Family: Carabidae
- Genus: Anthia
- Species: A. massilicata

Binomial name
- Anthia massilicata Guérin-Méneville, 1845

Species of beetle

Anthia massilicata is a species of ground beetle in the subfamily Anthiinae. It was described by Félix Édouard Guérin-Méneville in 1845.

The species occurs in Southern Africa, is very similar to Anthia fornasinii.
