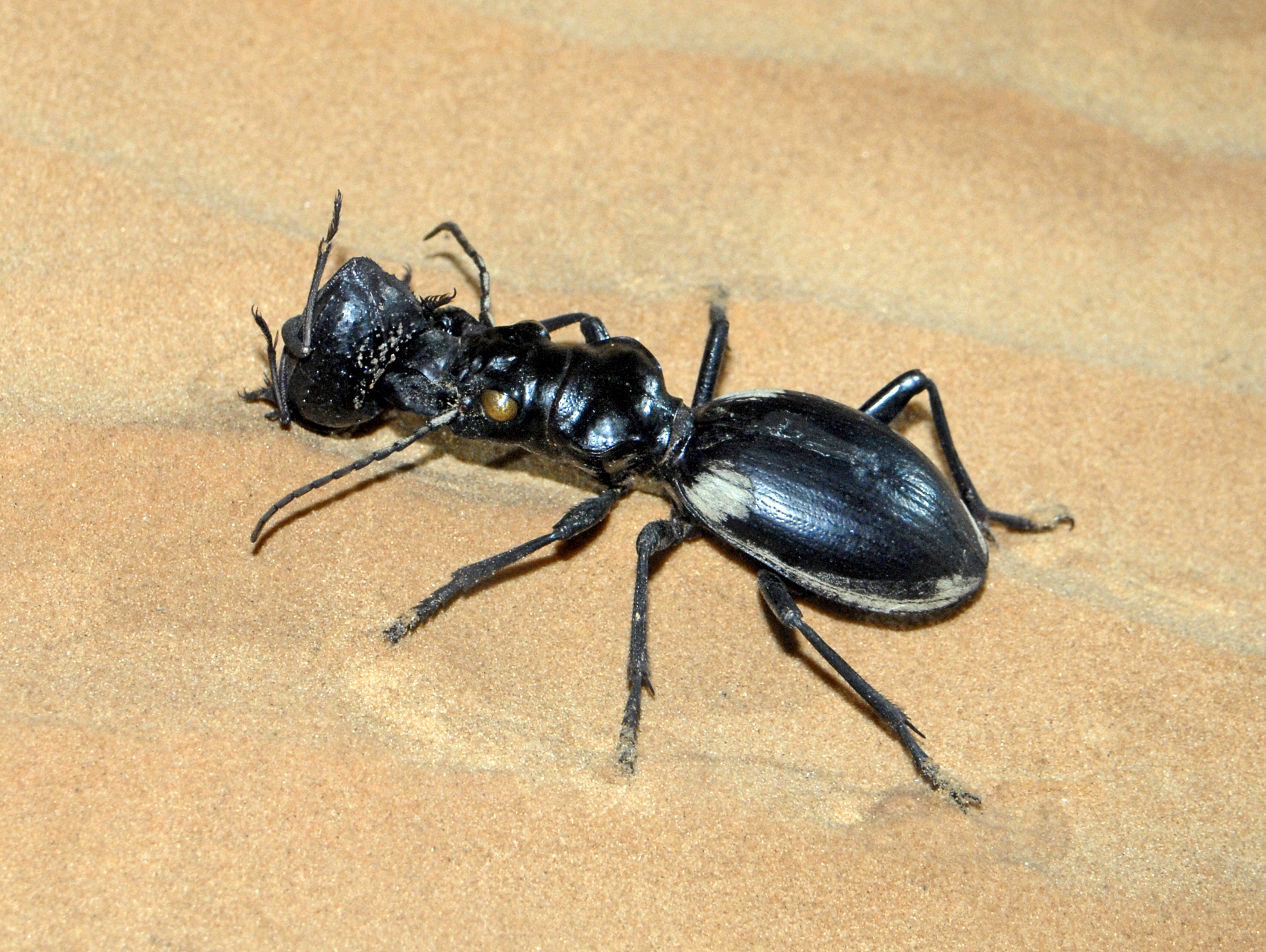

Scientific classification
- Kingdom: Animalia
- Phylum: Arthropoda
- Clade: Pancrustacea
- Class: Insecta
- Order: Coleoptera
- Suborder: Adephaga
- Family: Carabidae
- Genus: Anthia
- Species: A. venator

Binomial name
- Anthia venator (Fabricius, 1792)

= Anthia venator =

Species of beetle

Anthia venator is a beetle of the Family Carabidae.

== Description ==
Anthia venator can reach a length of 40–47 millimetres (1.6–1.9 in). These beetles are the biggest carabids of North Africa. They spend daylight hours hidden in burrows at the base of the bushes. Usually they hunt various insects at sunset.

== Distribution and habitat ==
This species is widespread in North Africa, in Algeria, Egypt, Libya, Morocco, Syria and Tunisia. These ground beetles prefer sandy habitats.
