= Anthia sulcata =

Scientific classification
- Kingdom: Animalia
- Phylum: Arthropoda
- Clade: Pancrustacea
- Class: Insecta
- Order: Coleoptera
- Suborder: Adephaga
- Family: Carabidae
- Genus: Anthia
- Species: A. sulcata

Binomial name
- Anthia sulcata (Fabricius, 1793)

Species of beetle

Anthia sulcata is a species of ground beetle in the subfamily Anthiinae. It was described by Johan Christian Fabricius in 1793.
