= Fornasini's blind snake =

Conservation status
- Least Concern (IUCN 3.1)

Scientific classification
- Kingdom: Animalia
- Phylum: Chordata
- Class: Reptilia
- Order: Squamata
- Suborder: Serpentes
- Family: Typhlopidae
- Genus: Afrotyphlops
- Species: A. fornasinii

Binomial name
- Afrotyphlops fornasinii Bianconi, 1849

Synonyms
- Typhlops fornasinii Bianconi, 1849; Onychocephalus trilobus W. Peters, 1854; Onychocephalus mossambicus W. Peters 1854; Onychocephalus tettensis W. Peters, 1860; Typhlops bianconii Jan in Jan & Sordelli, 1860; Typhlops fornasinii — Boulenger, 1893; Afrotyphlops fornasinii — Broadley & Wallach, 2009

Species of snake

Fornasini's blind snake (Afrotyphlops fornasinii) is a species of snake in the family Typhlopidae. The species is endemic to southern Africa.

== Etymology ==
The specific name fornasinii is in honor of Carlo Antonio Fornasini, merchant and amateur naturalist from Bologna, Italy, who collected the type specimen in Mozambique. He should not be confused with Carlo Fornasini (1854–1931), Italian paleontologist and politician.

== Geographic range ==
Fornasini's blind snake has been found in southern Mozambique, South Africa (Zululand), and southeastern Zimbabwe.

== Description ==
A. fornasinii is completely gray or black, except for some yellowish on the throat and the ventral surface of the tail. Adults may attain a snout–vent length (SVL) of 18 cm (7 inches). The scales are arranged in 22–27 rows around the body. There are fewer than 300 scales in the vertebral row.

The snout is very prominent, rounded, somewhat flattened, with a trilobate horizontal outline. The rostral is large, about half the width of the head, the portion visible from above almost as long as broad. The nostrils are located ventrally. The nasal is incompletely divided, the nasal cleft proceeding from the first upper labial. The scales on the upper surface of the head are enlarged. A preocular is present, in contact with the second upper labial. The preocular is slightly narrower than the nasal or the ocular. The eyes are barely distinguishable. There are four upper labials. The diameter of the body goes 23 to 30 times into the total length. The tail is short, slightly broader than long, ending in a spine.

== Habitat ==
A very small snake, A. fornasinii prefers grasslands and coastal bush. It is also found in shrubland and savanna up to an altitude of 450 m (1,480 ft).

== Behavior ==
A. fornasinii is terrestrial and fossorial, burrowing under leaf litter and logs.

== Reproduction ==
A. fornasinii is oviparous.
