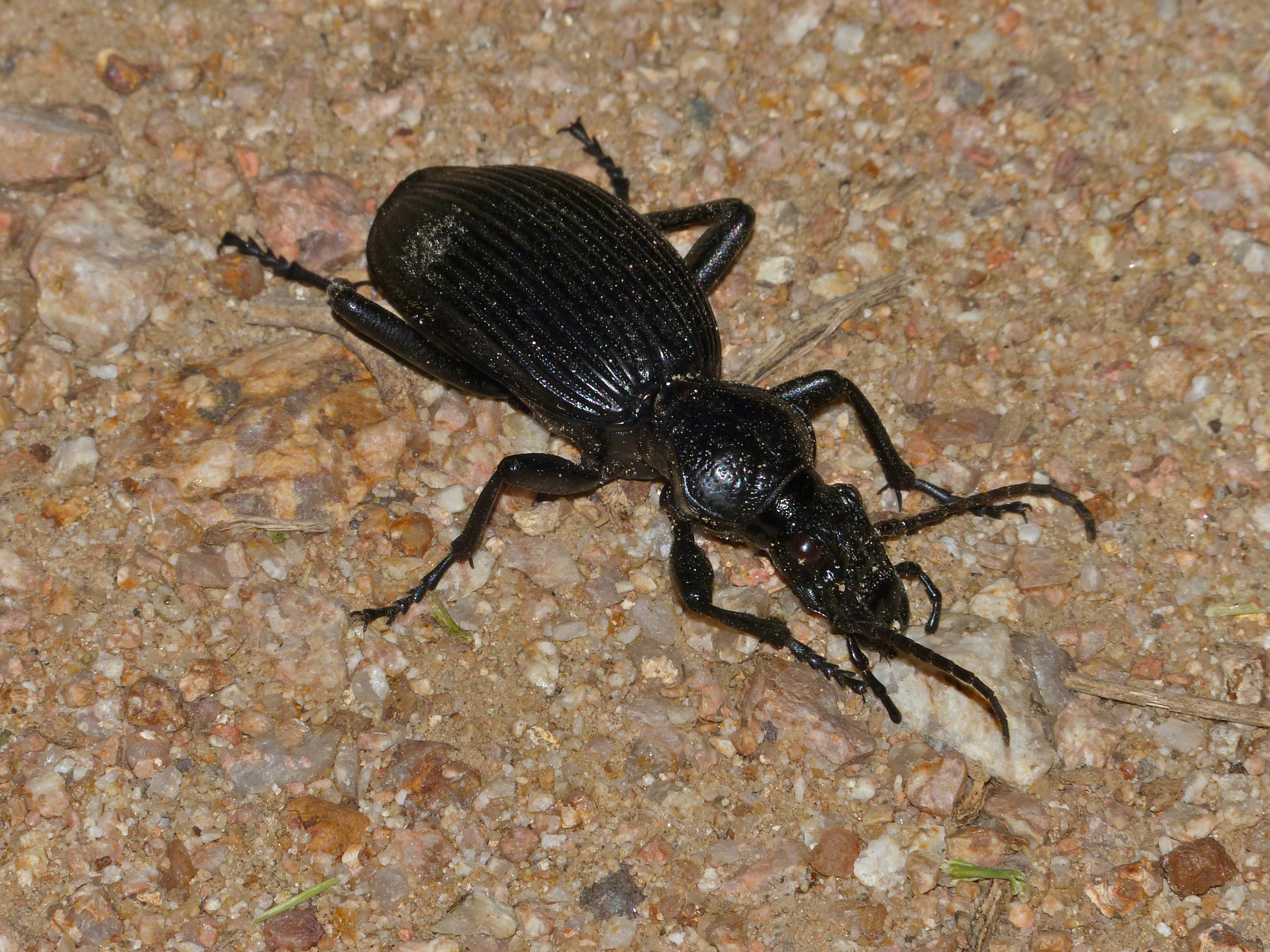

Scientific classification
- Kingdom: Animalia
- Phylum: Arthropoda
- Clade: Pancrustacea
- Class: Insecta
- Order: Coleoptera
- Suborder: Adephaga
- Family: Carabidae
- Genus: Anthia
- Species: A. fornasinii

Binomial name
- Anthia fornasinii Bertoloni, 1845

= Anthia fornasinii =

Species of beetle

Anthia fornasinii is a species of ground beetle in the subfamily Anthiinae. It was described by Bertoloni in 1845. It is found primarily in Central and East Africa.

The specific epithet fornasinii is in honour of Italian amateur naturalist Carlo Antonio Fornasini.
