= Carlo Antonio Fornasini =

Italian ivory trader and amateur field naturalist

Cavaliere Carlo Antonio Fornasini
- Born: 1802 or 1805; Bologna, Cisalpine Republic or Italian Republic or Kingdom of Italy (Note: The country of his birth depends on his exact date of birth. The Italian Republic replaced the Cisalpine Republic on 26 January 1802, and was itself replaced by the Kingdom of Italy on 17 March 1805.)
- Died: 1865 (aged 59-60 or 62-63)
- Occupations: Merchant; Naturalist
- Years active: 1839 or 1842 – no later than 1866
- Known for: The taxa named in his honour

Cavaliere Carlo Antonio Fornasini (1802/1805 – 1865) was an Italian ivory trader and amateur field naturalist who worked in Mozambique. (Note: During Fornasini's lifetime, Mozambique was to some extent a Portuguese colony, but the political situation was confused; see Portuguese Mozambique#History.) He collected numerous specimens of animals, insects and plants, and presented them to the Academy of Sciences of the Institute of Bologna in his home city for scientific study. He is remembered for having had several taxa named in his honour during his lifetime.

== Biography ==
Little seems to be known of his life or background. (Note: The first mention of any Fornasini in the scientific annals of Bologna seems to have been in 1844, when Antonio Bertoloni wrote that one Josephus Fornasinius (latinised version of Giuseppe Fornasini) of Bologna, a trader in Zanzibar, had corresponded with his (Bertoloni's) son. This may have been the Giuseppe Fornasini who addressed a meeting of the Academy of Sciences of the Institute of Bologna in 1852 on the topic of improvement of agriculture; but there seems to be nothing more than the name to connect the two, or either with Carlo.) The honorific cavaliere (roughly equivalent to the British 'Sir'; in the Latin-language sources which mention him, eques) suggests that he himself or his family had some civil distinction. He was from Bologna. Either, he travelled to Pernambuco in Brazil, and, on returning by way of Lisbon and Genoa to Bologna, was encouraged by Professor Antonio Bertoloni and by Count Camilla Salina to pursue in Africa his interest in natural history, and travelled to Mozambique; or, the House of Salina took a paternal interest in him, he left Bologna for Lisbon to pursue a career in commerce, and from there he went to Mozambique. He was a trader in ivory. In a letter dated 1843, he said that he had first visited Mozambique twelve years earlier. He was active as a naturalist in the Inhambane area of Mozambique from 1839 or from 1842. He presented the many natural history specimens he collected during his time in Africa to the Academy of Sciences of the Institute of Bologna, (Note: 19th century field naturalists were expert not only in observation. They were usually also expert in collecting specimens (for fauna, that means killing them); in describing them, even if not in the formal scientific manner; in drawing them; and in preserving them in such good condition that a skilled academic naturalist, who might be in another continent, could decide whether or not a species was, on the available evidence, new to science or the same as one already described.) where they were studied by Antonio Bertoloni (1775-1869, physician and botanist), his son Giuseppe Bertoloni (1804-1874, botanist and entomologist), and Giovanni Giuseppe Bianconi (1809-1878, zoologist, herpetologist, botanist and geologist), all professors at the University of Bologna, all full of praise for his labours. (Note: The younger Bertolini published at least 13 papers on the natural history of Mozambique (1849-1864) and Bianconi at least 16 (1850-1866), most of which acknowledge specimens contributed by Fornasini. Both of them described many such specimens as species new to science (Latin: nobis, [new] to us). It would seem fair to say that Fornasini was central to both their scientific careers.) Antonio Alessandrini, another professor at the university, called him 'courageous' (Italian: coraggioso). (Note: That was not just flowery language. Giuseppe Bertoloni called Mozambique 'that inhospitable land' (Latin: inhospita terra). (Bertoloni's remarks about the hazards of dealing with "naked black savages" except from an armed merchant ship may perhaps be overstated. History suggests that native inhabitants were often willing to trade with foreign visitors on mutually advantageous terms.) German naturalist and explorer Wilhelm Peters (1815-1883), who had been in Mozambique from 1843 to 1848, in 1852 called the climate of Mozambique 'hostile to Europeans' (German: Das Klima ist den Europäern [...] feindselig); and apologised for being so slow in writing up his discoveries, because he had been recovering from the tropical fevers he had contracted there.) He was last mentioned in the scientific annals of Bologna in 1866.

He does not seem to have written any scientific papers. He is not named as author in any of the journals published by the Academy of Sciences between 1834 and 1866.

== Taxa named in honour ==
These are (in date order of the epithet fornasini and suchlike):

- Anthia fornasinii G. Bertoloni 1845, a ground beetle
- Thornback cowfish, Lactoria fornasini Bianconi 1846 (as Ostracion fornasini), a marine fish
- Fornasini's blind snake, Afrotyphlops fornasinii Bianconi 1849 (as Typhlops fornasinii)
- Fornasini's spiny reed frog, Afrixalus fornasini Bianconi 1849 (as Euchnemis fornasini)
- Fornasinia A. Bertoloni 1849, a genus of legume in family Leguminosae
- Fornasinia ebenifera A. Bertoloni 1849 (type species), a species in genus Fornasinia (Note: F. ebenifera is an unresolved name. It has been said to be a basionym of Millettia ebenifera, a species in genus Millettia Wight and Arn. 1834.)
- Myomenippe fornasinii Bianconi 1851 (as Menippe fornasinii), (Note: No description by Bianconi of Menippe fornasinii has been located. This species may be the same as Galene fornasinii Bianconi 1851, which is absent from the WoRMS database record for genus Galene.) a crab in genus Myomenippe in family Menippidae
- Fornasinius G. Bertoloni 1853, a genus of scarab beetle in subfamily Cetoniinae (Note: It is unclear when and by whom Fornasinius was elevated to the rank of genus.)
- Fornasinius fornasinii G. Bertoloni 1853 (as Goliathus fornasini; type species), a species in genus Fornasinius
- Fulvia fragilis Forsskål in Niebuhr 1775, Cardium fornasinianum Bianconi 1856, a cockle (a shellfish) in genus Fulvia
- Eleotris fusca Forster 1801, Eleotris fornasini Bianconi 1856, a freshwater and estuarine fish (Note: No 1856 description of E. Fusca has been located. Bianconi's 1858 description calls the species nobis (Latin for '[new] to us').)
- Harlequin quail, Coturnix delegorguei Delegorgue 1847, Coturnix fornasini Bianconi 1865, a bird (Note: C. fornasini was identified as a junior synonym of C. delegorguei by Ogilvie-Grant in 1892.)
