= Mecyclothorax altiusculus =

Scientific classification
- Domain: Eukaryota
- Kingdom: Animalia
- Phylum: Arthropoda
- Class: Insecta
- Order: Coleoptera
- Suborder: Adephaga
- Family: Carabidae
- Genus: Mecyclothorax
- Species: M. altiusculus

Binomial name
- Mecyclothorax altiusculus (Britton, 1938)

Species of beetle

Mecyclothorax altiusculus is a species of ground beetle in the subfamily Psydrinae. It was described by Britton in 1938.
