= Mecyclothorax monteithi =

Scientific classification
- Domain: Eukaryota
- Kingdom: Animalia
- Phylum: Arthropoda
- Class: Insecta
- Order: Coleoptera
- Suborder: Adephaga
- Family: Carabidae
- Genus: Mecyclothorax
- Species: M. monteithi

Binomial name
- Mecyclothorax monteithi Moore, 1985

Species of beetle

Mecyclothorax monteithi is a species of ground beetle in the subfamily Psydrinae. It was described by Barry P. Moore in 1985.
