= Mecyclothorax arcuatus =

Scientific classification
- Kingdom: Animalia
- Phylum: Arthropoda
- Class: Insecta
- Order: Coleoptera
- Suborder: Adephaga
- Family: Carabidae
- Genus: Mecyclothorax
- Species: M. arcuatus

Binomial name
- Mecyclothorax arcuatus Liebherr, 2006

Species of beetle

Mecyclothorax arcuatus is a species of ground beetle in the subfamily Psydrinae. It was described by Liebherr in 2006.
