= Mecyclothorax fleutiauxi =

Scientific classification
- Domain: Eukaryota
- Kingdom: Animalia
- Phylum: Arthropoda
- Class: Insecta
- Order: Coleoptera
- Suborder: Adephaga
- Family: Carabidae
- Genus: Mecyclothorax
- Species: M. fleutiauxi

Binomial name
- Mecyclothorax fleutiauxi (Jeannel, 1944)

Species of beetle

Mecyclothorax fleutiauxi is a species of ground beetle in the subfamily Psydrinae. It was described by Jeannel in 1944.
