= Mecyclothorax oopteroides =

Scientific classification
- Kingdom: Animalia
- Phylum: Arthropoda
- Class: Insecta
- Order: Coleoptera
- Suborder: Adephaga
- Family: Carabidae
- Genus: Mecyclothorax
- Species: M. oopteroides

Binomial name
- Mecyclothorax oopteroides Liebherr & Marris, 2009

Species of beetle

Mecyclothorax oopteroides is a species of ground beetle in the subfamily Psydrinae. It was described by Liebherr & Marris in 2009.
