= Mecyclothorax funebris =

Scientific classification
- Kingdom: Animalia
- Phylum: Arthropoda
- Class: Insecta
- Order: Coleoptera
- Suborder: Adephaga
- Family: Carabidae
- Genus: Mecyclothorax
- Species: M. funebris

Binomial name
- Mecyclothorax funebris Liebherr, 2008

Species of beetle

Mecyclothorax funebris is a species of ground beetle in the subfamily Psydrinae. It was described by Liebherr in 2008.
