= Mecyclothorax subunctus =

Scientific classification
- Domain: Eukaryota
- Kingdom: Animalia
- Phylum: Arthropoda
- Class: Insecta
- Order: Coleoptera
- Suborder: Adephaga
- Family: Carabidae
- Genus: Mecyclothorax
- Species: M. subunctus

Binomial name
- Mecyclothorax subunctus (Perkins, 1917)

Synonyms
- Mecyclothorax parvus Britton, 1948

Species of beetle

Mecyclothorax subunctus is a species of ground beetle in the subfamily Psydrinae. It was described by Perkins in 1917.
