= Mecyclothorax constrictus =

Scientific classification
- Kingdom: Animalia
- Phylum: Arthropoda
- Class: Insecta
- Order: Coleoptera
- Suborder: Adephaga
- Family: Carabidae
- Genus: Mecyclothorax
- Species: M. constrictus

Binomial name
- Mecyclothorax constrictus (Sharp, 1903)

Species of beetle

Mecyclothorax constrictus is a species of ground beetle in the subfamily Psydrinae, described by David Sharp in 1903.
