= Mecyclothorax taiarapu =

Scientific classification
- Kingdom: Animalia
- Phylum: Arthropoda
- Clade: Pancrustacea
- Class: Insecta
- Order: Coleoptera
- Suborder: Adephaga
- Family: Carabidae
- Genus: Mecyclothorax
- Species: M. taiarapu

Binomial name
- Mecyclothorax taiarapu Perrault, 1989

Species of beetle

Mecyclothorax taiarapu is a species of ground beetle in the subfamily Psydrinae endemic to the Tairapu Peninsula in French Polynesia. It was described by Perrault in 1989.
