= Mecyclothorax filipes =

Scientific classification
- Kingdom: Animalia
- Phylum: Arthropoda
- Class: Insecta
- Order: Coleoptera
- Suborder: Adephaga
- Family: Carabidae
- Genus: Mecyclothorax
- Species: M. filipes

Binomial name
- Mecyclothorax filipes (Sharp, 1903)

Species of beetle

Mecyclothorax filipes is a species of ground beetle in the subfamily Psydrinae. It was described by Sharp in 1903.
