= Mecyclothorax lissus =

Scientific classification
- Domain: Eukaryota
- Kingdom: Animalia
- Phylum: Arthropoda
- Class: Insecta
- Order: Coleoptera
- Suborder: Adephaga
- Family: Carabidae
- Genus: Mecyclothorax
- Species: M. lissus

Binomial name
- Mecyclothorax lissus (Castelnau, 1867)

Species of beetle

Mecyclothorax lissus is a species of ground beetle in the subfamily Psydrinae. It was described by Castelnau in 1867.
