= Mecyclothorax impressipennis =

Scientific classification
- Kingdom: Animalia
- Phylum: Arthropoda
- Class: Insecta
- Order: Coleoptera
- Suborder: Adephaga
- Family: Carabidae
- Genus: Mecyclothorax
- Species: M. impressipennis

Binomial name
- Mecyclothorax impressipennis Baehr, 2003

Species of beetle

Mecyclothorax impressipennis is a species of ground beetle in the subfamily Psydrinae. It was described by Baehr in 2003.
