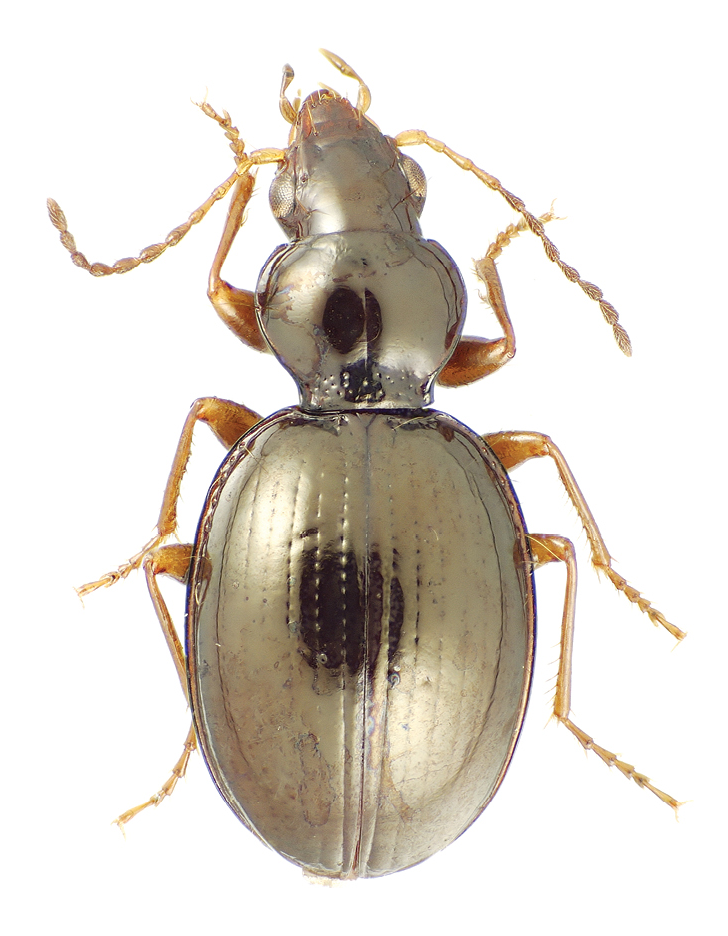

Scientific classification
- Kingdom: Animalia
- Phylum: Arthropoda
- Class: Insecta
- Order: Coleoptera
- Suborder: Adephaga
- Family: Carabidae
- Genus: Mecyclothorax
- Species: M. anaana

Binomial name
- Mecyclothorax anaana Liebherr, 2012

= Mecyclothorax anaana =

Species of beetle

Mecyclothorax sinuatus is a species of ground beetle in the subfamily Psydrinae. It was described by Liebherr in 2012.
