= Mecyclothorax fosbergioides =

Scientific classification
- Domain: Eukaryota
- Kingdom: Animalia
- Phylum: Arthropoda
- Class: Insecta
- Order: Coleoptera
- Suborder: Adephaga
- Family: Carabidae
- Genus: Mecyclothorax
- Species: M. fosbergioides

Binomial name
- Mecyclothorax fosbergioides Perrault, 1988

Species of beetle

Mecyclothorax fosbergioides is a species of ground beetle in the subfamily Psydrinae. It was described by Perrault in 1988.
