= Mecyclothorax sabulicola =

Scientific classification
- Domain: Eukaryota
- Kingdom: Animalia
- Phylum: Arthropoda
- Class: Insecta
- Order: Coleoptera
- Suborder: Adephaga
- Family: Carabidae
- Genus: Mecyclothorax
- Species: M. sabulicola

Binomial name
- Mecyclothorax sabulicola (Britton, 1948)

Species of beetle

Mecyclothorax sabulicola is a species of ground beetle in the subfamily Psydrinae. It was described by Britton in 1948.
