= Mecyclothorax jiwikae =

Scientific classification
- Domain: Eukaryota
- Kingdom: Animalia
- Phylum: Arthropoda
- Class: Insecta
- Order: Coleoptera
- Suborder: Adephaga
- Family: Carabidae
- Genus: Mecyclothorax
- Species: M. jiwikae

Binomial name
- Mecyclothorax jiwikae Baehr, 1995

Species of beetle

Mecyclothorax jiwikae is a species of ground beetle in the subfamily Psydrinae. It was described by Baehr in 1995.
