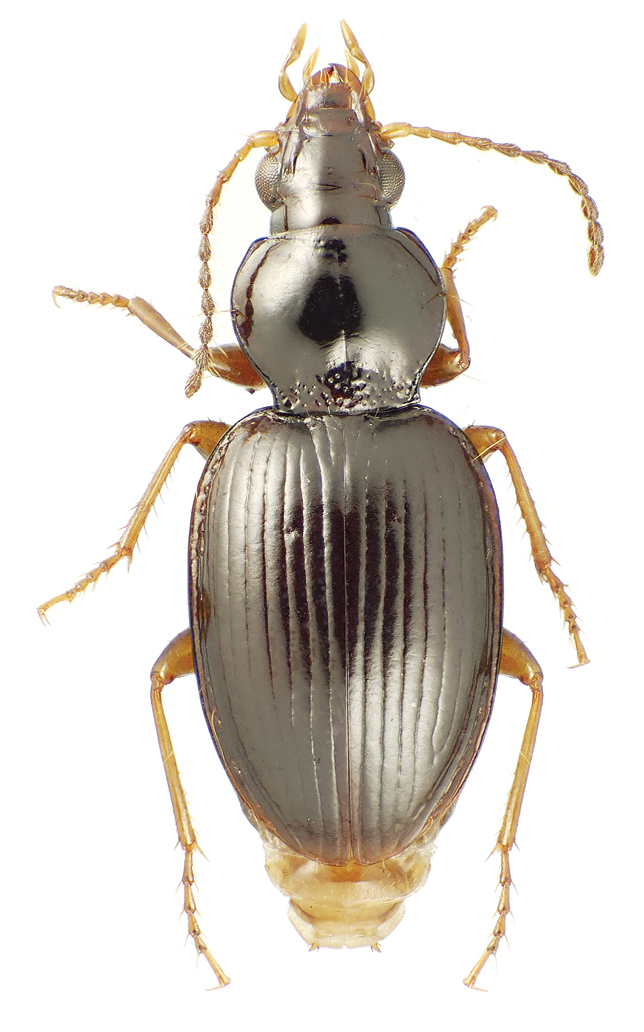
- Mecyclothorax toretore female holotype.

Scientific classification
- Kingdom: Animalia
- Phylum: Arthropoda
- Class: Insecta
- Order: Coleoptera
- Suborder: Adephaga
- Family: Carabidae
- Subfamily: Psydrinae
- Tribe: Moriomorphini
- Subtribe: Amblytelina
- Genus: Mecyclothorax; Sharp, 1903

Subgenera
- Eucyclothorax Liebherr, 2018; Mecyclothorax Sharp, 1903; Meonochilus Liebherr & Marris, 2009; Phacothorax Jeannel, 1944; Qecyclothorax Liebjerr, 2018

= Mecyclothorax =

Genus of beetles

Mecyclothorax is a genus of beetles that contains over 400 described species or subspecies, mostly from the Hawaiian Islands, and Tahiti and Moorea, French Polynesia. Additional radiations have evolved in Queensland, Australia, New Guinea and New Caledonia. The genus has been divided into five subgenera: Eucyclothorax Liebherr 2018 of Australia, Qecyclothorax Liebherr 2018 of Queensland, Australia, Meonochilus Liebherr & Marris, 2009 of New Zealand, Phacothorax Jeannel 1944 of New Caledonia, and the more widely distributed subgenus Mecyclothorax Sharp 1903 [in Australia, the Sundas, New Zealand, the Society Islands (Moorea and Tahiti), and Hawaii]. The adelphotaxon to Mecyclothorax is hypothesized to consist of the genera associated with Amblytelus Blackburn, also distributed in Australia, and therefore the evolutionary history of Mecyclothorax commenced in Australia.

== Species ==
These 415 species belong to Mecyclothorax.

- Mecyclothorax aa Liebherr, 2008
- Mecyclothorax aano Liebherr, 2013 (Tahiti)
- Mecyclothorax abax Liebherr, 2006
- Mecyclothorax acutangulus Perrault, 1988 (Tahiti)
- Mecyclothorax aeneipennis Liebherr, 2005
- Mecyclothorax aeneus Sharp, 1903 (Oceania)
- Mecyclothorax affinis Liebherr, 2015 (Hawaii)
- Mecyclothorax ahulili Liebherr, 2015 (Hawaii)
- Mecyclothorax allostriatus Liebherr, 2011 (Hawaii)
- Mecyclothorax altiusculoides Perrault, 1987 (Tahiti)
- Mecyclothorax altiusculus (Britton, 1938) (Tahiti)
- Mecyclothorax amaroides Sharp, 1903 (Oceania)
- Mecyclothorax ambiguus (Erichson, 1842) (New Zealand and Australia)
- Mecyclothorax ambulatus Liebherr, 2015 (Hawaii)
- Mecyclothorax amingwiwae Liebherr, 2017 (New Guinea and Papua)
- Mecyclothorax amplipennis (Broun, 1912) (New Zealand)
- Mecyclothorax anaana Liebherr, 2012 (Tahiti)
- Mecyclothorax anchisteus Liebherr, 2015 (Hawaii)
- Mecyclothorax andersoni Liebherr, 2017 (New Guinea and Papua)
- Mecyclothorax angulosus Perrault, 1989 (Tahiti)
- Mecyclothorax angusticollis (Blackburn, 1878) (Oceania)
- Mecyclothorax annae Liebherr, 2006
- Mecyclothorax antaeus Liebherr, 2015 (Hawaii)
- Mecyclothorax anthracinus Liebherr, 2015 (Hawaii)
- Mecyclothorax aorai Perrault, 1978 (Tahiti)
- Mecyclothorax apicalis (Sharp, 1903) (Oceania)
- Mecyclothorax aquilus Liebherr, 2015 (Hawaii)
- Mecyclothorax arboricola Liebherr, 2013 (Tahiti)
- Mecyclothorax arcanus Liebherr, 2011 (Hawaii)
- Mecyclothorax arcuatus Liebherr, 2006
- Mecyclothorax argutor (Sharp, 1903) (Oceania)
- Mecyclothorax argutuloides Liebherr, 2015 (Hawaii)
- Mecyclothorax argutulus Liebherr, 2015 (Hawaii)
- Mecyclothorax arthuri Liebherr, 2015 (Hawaii)
- Mecyclothorax ata Perrault, 1978 (Tahiti)
- Mecyclothorax ataraensis Perrault, 1989 (Tahiti)
- Mecyclothorax ater Britton, 1948 (Oceania)
- Mecyclothorax bacrionis Liebherr, 2015 (Hawaii)
- Mecyclothorax badius Liebherr, 2011 (Hawaii)
- Mecyclothorax baehri B.Gueorguiev, 2013 (New Guinea and Papua)
- Mecyclothorax balli Perrault, 1978 (Tahiti)
- Mecyclothorax ballioides Perrault, 1978 (Tahiti)
- Mecyclothorax bartletti Liebherr, 2011 (Hawaii)
- Mecyclothorax basipunctus Louwerens, 1953 (Indonesia)
- Mecyclothorax bellorum (Liebherr, 2011) (New Zealand)
- Mecyclothorax bembidicus Sharp, 1903 (Oceania)
- Mecyclothorax bembidioides (Blackburn, 1879) (Oceania)
- Mecyclothorax bicolor Sharp, 1903 (Oceania)
- Mecyclothorax bicoloratus Liebherr, 2015 (Hawaii)
- Mecyclothorax bicoloris Liebherr, 2015 (Hawaii)
- Mecyclothorax bilaianus Baehr, 1998 (Indonesia and New Guinea)
- Mecyclothorax bilobatus Liebherr, 2015 (Hawaii)
- Mecyclothorax blackburni (Sloane, 1898) (Australia)
- Mecyclothorax blackburnianus Liebherr, 2008
- Mecyclothorax bougainvillei Perrault, 1986 (Tahiti)
- Mecyclothorax bradycellinus Sharp, 1903 (Oceania)
- Mecyclothorax bradycelloides Liebherr, 2015 (Hawaii)
- Mecyclothorax bradyderus (Sharp, 1903) (Oceania)
- Mecyclothorax brevidux Liebherr, 2015 (Hawaii)
- Mecyclothorax brevipennis Perrault, 1984 (Tahiti)
- Mecyclothorax brevis (Blackburn, 1878) (Oceania)
- Mecyclothorax brispex Liebherr, 2017 (New Guinea and Papua)
- Mecyclothorax brittoni Perrault, 1978 (Tahiti)
- Mecyclothorax bryobioides Perrault, 1987 (Tahiti)
- Mecyclothorax bryobius (Britton, 1938) (Tahiti)
- Mecyclothorax carteri (Perkins, 1917) (Oceania)
- Mecyclothorax castaneus Perrault, 1986 (Tahiti)
- Mecyclothorax ceteratus Liebherr, 2011 (Hawaii)
- Mecyclothorax chalcosus (Sharp, 1903) (Oceania and Hawaii)
- Mecyclothorax claridgeiae Liebherr, 2013 (Tahiti)
- Mecyclothorax clermontianus Liebherr, 2011 (Hawaii)
- Mecyclothorax cognatus Sharp, 1903 (Oceania)
- Mecyclothorax comma Liebherr, 2006
- Mecyclothorax consanguineus Liebherr, 2015 (Hawaii)
- Mecyclothorax consobrinus Liebherr, 2005
- Mecyclothorax constrictus (Sharp, 1903) (Oceania and Tahiti)
- Mecyclothorax contractus Liebherr, 2015 (Hawaii)
- Mecyclothorax convexicollis (Emden, 1937) (Indonesia)
- Mecyclothorax convexus Liebherr, 2006
- Mecyclothorax cooki Perrault, 1986 (Tahiti)
- Mecyclothorax cordaticollaris Liebherr, 2015 (Hawaii)
- Mecyclothorax cordaticollis (Blackburn, 1878) (Oceania)
- Mecyclothorax cordicollis (Sloane, 1900) (Australia)
- Mecyclothorax cordithorax Liebherr, 2005
- Mecyclothorax crassuloides Liebherr, 2015 (Hawaii)
- Mecyclothorax crassulus Liebherr, 2015 (Hawaii)
- Mecyclothorax crassus (Sharp, 1903) (Oceania and Hawaii)
- Mecyclothorax cuccodoroi Baehr, 2002 (New Guinea and Papua)
- Mecyclothorax cupreoides Perrault, 1978 (Tahiti)
- Mecyclothorax cupreus Perrault, 1978 (Tahiti)
- Mecyclothorax cupripennis Perrault, 1989 (Tahiti)
- Mecyclothorax curtipes (Sharp, 1903) (Oceania)
- Mecyclothorax curtisi Liebherr, 2013 (Tahiti)
- Mecyclothorax curtus (Sloane, 1895) (Australia)
- Mecyclothorax cymindicus Sharp, 1903 (Oceania)
- Mecyclothorax cymindoides Liebherr, 2006
- Mecyclothorax cymindulus Liebherr, 2015 (Hawaii)
- Mecyclothorax dannieae Perrault, 1978 (Tahiti)
- Mecyclothorax daptinus Sharp, 1903 (Oceania)
- Mecyclothorax darlingtoni Liebherr, 2018 (Australia)
- Mecyclothorax debiliceps Liebherr, 2006
- Mecyclothorax debilis (Sharp, 1903) (Oceania)
- Mecyclothorax deverilli (Blackburn, 1879) (Oceania)
- Mecyclothorax discedens (Sharp, 1903) (Oceania)
- Mecyclothorax dispar Liebherr, 2015 (Hawaii)
- Mecyclothorax doesburgi Louwerens, 1949 (Indonesia)
- Mecyclothorax ducalis (Sharp, 1903) (Oceania)
- Mecyclothorax dunbarorum Liebherr, 2006
- Mecyclothorax ehu Liebherr, 2013 (Tahiti)
- Mecyclothorax eipomeki Baehr, 1995 (Indonesia and New Guinea)
- Mecyclothorax eliti Baehr, 1995 (Indonesia and New Guinea)
- Mecyclothorax eplicatus (Broun, 1923) (New Zealand)
- Mecyclothorax everardi Liebherr, 2013 (Tahiti)
- Mecyclothorax ewingi Liebherr, 2006
- Mecyclothorax excavatus Liebherr, 2011 (Hawaii)
- Mecyclothorax exilioides Liebherr, 2011 (Hawaii)
- Mecyclothorax exilis Britton, 1948 (Oceania and Hawaii)
- Mecyclothorax externestriatus Perrault, 1989 (Tahiti)
- Mecyclothorax eyrensis (Blackburn, 1892) (Australia)
- Mecyclothorax fairmairei Perrault, 1986 (Tahiti)
- Mecyclothorax fatata Liebherr, 2012 (Tahiti)
- Mecyclothorax fefemata Liebherr, 2013 (Tahiti)
- Mecyclothorax ferovipennis Liebherr, 2011 (Hawaii)
- Mecyclothorax ferruginosus Perrault, 1987 (Tahiti)
- Mecyclothorax filipes (Sharp, 1903) (Oceania)
- Mecyclothorax filipoides Liebherr, 2015 (Hawaii)
- Mecyclothorax filitarsis Liebherr, 2011 (Hawaii)
- Mecyclothorax flaviventris Liebherr, 2015 (Hawaii)
- Mecyclothorax flavolateralis Liebherr, 2006
- Mecyclothorax flavomarginatus Britton, 1948 (Oceania and Hawaii)
- Mecyclothorax fleutiauxi (Jeannel, 1944) (New Caledonia)
- Mecyclothorax footei Liebherr, 2008
- Mecyclothorax fosbergi Perrault, 1979 (Tahiti)
- Mecyclothorax fosbergioides Perrault, 1988 (Tahiti)
- Mecyclothorax foveolatus Liebherr, 2015 (Hawaii)
- Mecyclothorax foveopunctatus Liebherr, 2015 (Hawaii)
- Mecyclothorax funebris Liebherr, 2008
- Mecyclothorax fuscus Perrault, 1989 (Tahiti)
- Mecyclothorax gagnei Liebherr, 2008
- Mecyclothorax geminatus Liebherr, 2011 (Hawaii)
- Mecyclothorax georgettae Perrault, 1978 (Tahiti)
- Mecyclothorax gerardi Perrault, 1978 (Tahiti)
- Mecyclothorax giffardi Liebherr, 2005
- Mecyclothorax giffini Liebherr, 2008
- Mecyclothorax globicollis (Mandl, 1969) (Borneo and Indonesia)
- Mecyclothorax globosoides Perrault, 1989 (Tahiti)
- Mecyclothorax globosus Britton, 1948 (Tahiti)
- Mecyclothorax globulosus Perrault, 1978 (Tahiti)
- Mecyclothorax gourvesi Perrault, 1978 (Tahiti)
- Mecyclothorax gourvesioides Perrault, 1988 (Tahiti)
- Mecyclothorax goweri B.Moore, 1992
- Mecyclothorax gracilicollis Liebherr, 2015 (Hawaii)
- Mecyclothorax gracilis (Sharp, 1903) (Oceania)
- Mecyclothorax granulatus Liebherr, 2006
- Mecyclothorax granulipennis Liebherr, 2008
- Mecyclothorax gressitti Liebherr, 2017 (New Guinea and Papua)
- Mecyclothorax haleakalae (Sharp, 1903) (Oceania)
- Mecyclothorax hamatus Perrault, 1987 (Tahiti)
- Mecyclothorax haydeni Liebherr, 2015 (Hawaii)
- Mecyclothorax hemisphaericus Perrault, 1989 (Tahiti)
- Mecyclothorax hephaestoides Liebherr, 2015 (Hawaii)
- Mecyclothorax hephaestus Liebherr, 2008
- Mecyclothorax hoeahiti Liebherr, 2013 (Tahiti)
- Mecyclothorax howei B.Moore, 1992
- Mecyclothorax hunapopoti Liebherr, 2013 (Tahiti)
- Mecyclothorax impressipennis Baehr, 2003 (Australia)
- Mecyclothorax improcerus Liebherr, 2011 (Hawaii)
- Mecyclothorax impunctatus Liebherr, 2006
- Mecyclothorax inaequalis (Blackburn, 1878) (Oceania)
- Mecyclothorax incompositus Britton, 1948 (Oceania)
- Mecyclothorax inconscriptus Liebherr, 2015 (Hawaii)
- Mecyclothorax inflatus Baehr, 2003 (Australia)
- Mecyclothorax insolitus (Sharp, 1903) (Oceania)
- Mecyclothorax integer Sharp, 1903 (Hawaii)
- Mecyclothorax interruptus Sharp, 1903 (Oceania and Hawaii)
- Mecyclothorax invisitatus Liebherr, 2015 (Hawaii)
- Mecyclothorax irregularis Britton, 1948 (Oceania and Hawaii)
- Mecyclothorax isolatus Liebherr, 2018 (Australia)
- Mecyclothorax iteratus Sharp, 1903 (Oceania)
- Mecyclothorax jameswalkeri Liebherr, 2018 (Australia)
- Mecyclothorax jarrigei Perrault, 1978 (Tahiti)
- Mecyclothorax jeanneli Liebherr, 2018 (New Caledonia)
- Mecyclothorax jeanyvesi Liebherr, 2013 (Tahiti)
- Mecyclothorax jiwikae Baehr, 1995 (Indonesia and New Guinea)
- Mecyclothorax joni Liebherr, 2006
- Mecyclothorax julianae Baehr, 1995 (Indonesia and New Guinea)
- Mecyclothorax kahalawaiae Liebherr, 2011 (Hawaii)
- Mecyclothorax kanak B.Moore & Liebherr, 2018 (New Caledonia)
- Mecyclothorax karschi (Blackburn, 1882) (Oceania)
- Mecyclothorax kaukukini Liebherr, 2008
- Mecyclothorax kaumakani Liebherr, 2015 (Hawaii)
- Mecyclothorax kavanaughi Liebherr, 2008 (New Guinea and Papua)
- Mecyclothorax kayballae Liebherr, 2013 (Tahiti)
- Mecyclothorax kipahulu Liebherr, 2015 (Hawaii)
- Mecyclothorax kipwilli Liebherr, 2015 (Hawaii)
- Mecyclothorax kokone Liebherr, 2013 (Tahiti)
- Mecyclothorax konanus Sharp, 1903 (Oceania)
- Mecyclothorax konemata Liebherr, 2013 (Tahiti)
- Mecyclothorax krushelnyckyi Liebherr, 2015 (Hawaii)
- Mecyclothorax kubor Baehr, 2008 (New Guinea and Papua)
- Mecyclothorax kuiki Liebherr, 2015 (Hawaii)
- Mecyclothorax lackneri Baehr, 2008 (Indonesia and New Guinea)
- Mecyclothorax laetus (Blackburn, 1881) (Oceania)
- Mecyclothorax laevilateralis Perrault, 1989 (Tahiti)
- Mecyclothorax lahainae Britton, 1948 (Oceania and Hawaii)
- Mecyclothorax langdae Baehr, 1995 (Indonesia and New Guinea)
- Mecyclothorax lateralis (Laporte, 1867) (Australia)
- Mecyclothorax laterobustus Liebherr, 2018 (New Caledonia)
- Mecyclothorax laterorectus Liebherr, 2018 (New Caledonia)
- Mecyclothorax laterosinuatus Liebherr, 2018 (New Caledonia)
- Mecyclothorax laterovatulus Liebherr, 2018 (New Caledonia)
- Mecyclothorax latissimus Liebherr, 2006
- Mecyclothorax latus Liebherr, 2006
- Mecyclothorax lewisensis B.Moore, 1984 (Australia)
- Mecyclothorax lisae Liebherr, 2006
- Mecyclothorax lissopterus Liebherr, 2006
- Mecyclothorax lissus (Andrewes, 1933) (Indonesia)
- Mecyclothorax loebli Baehr, 2002 (New Guinea and Papua)
- Mecyclothorax longidux Liebherr, 2015 (Hawaii)
- Mecyclothorax longulus Sharp, 1903 (Oceania)
- Mecyclothorax lophoides (Chaudoir, 1854) (Australia)
- Mecyclothorax lyratus Liebherr, 2011 (Hawaii)
- Mecyclothorax macrops (Sharp, 1903) (Oceania)
- Mecyclothorax mahatahi Liebherr, 2012 (Tahiti)
- Mecyclothorax mahina Perrault, 1984 (Tahiti)
- Mecyclothorax major Liebherr, 2015 (Hawaii)
- Mecyclothorax manautei Liebherr, 2018 (New Caledonia)
- Mecyclothorax manducus Liebherr, 2015 (Hawaii)
- Mecyclothorax manina Liebherr, 2013 (Tahiti)
- Mecyclothorax maninamata Liebherr, 2013 (Tahiti)
- Mecyclothorax maninapopoti Liebherr, 2013 (Tahiti)
- Mecyclothorax mapo Liebherr, 2012 (Tahiti)
- Mecyclothorax mapura Perrault, 1984 (Tahiti)
- Mecyclothorax marau Perrault, 1978 (Tahiti)
- Mecyclothorax marginatus Perrault, 1978 (Tahiti)
- Mecyclothorax mauiae Liebherr, 2015 (Hawaii)
- Mecyclothorax maunakukini Liebherr, 2008
- Mecyclothorax medeirosi Liebherr, 2015 (Hawaii)
- Mecyclothorax medioconstrictus Liebherr, 2017 (New Guinea and Papua)
- Mecyclothorax megalovatulus Liebherr, 2018 (New Caledonia)
- Mecyclothorax menemene Liebherr, 2012 (Tahiti)
- Mecyclothorax micans (Blackburn, 1878) (Oceania)
- Mecyclothorax microps Sharp, 1903 (Oceania)
- Mecyclothorax minimops Liebherr, 2011 (Hawaii)
- Mecyclothorax minor Britton, 1948 (Oceania and Hawaii)
- Mecyclothorax minutus (Laporte, 1867) (Tahiti and Australia)
- Mecyclothorax molokaiae (Sharp, 1903) (Oceania)
- Mecyclothorax molops (Sharp, 1903) (Oceania)
- Mecyclothorax montanus Liebherr, 2015 (Hawaii)
- Mecyclothorax monteithi B.Moore, 1985 (Australia)
- Mecyclothorax montivagus (Blackburn, 1878) (Oceania)
- Mecyclothorax moorei Baehr, 2009 (Australia)
- Mecyclothorax mordax Liebherr, 2015 (Hawaii)
- Mecyclothorax mordicus Liebherr, 2015 (Hawaii)
- Mecyclothorax mouensis B.Moore & Liebherr, 2018 (New Caledonia)
- Mecyclothorax multipunctatus (Blackburn, 1878) (Oceania)
- Mecyclothorax mundanus (Sharp, 1903) (Oceania)
- Mecyclothorax munroi (Perkins, 1937) (Oceania and Hawaii)
- Mecyclothorax muriauxi Perrault, 1978 (Tahiti)
- Mecyclothorax najtae Deuve, 1987 (New Caledonia)
- Mecyclothorax nanunctus Liebherr, 2015 (Hawaii)
- Mecyclothorax negrei Perrault, 1986 (Tahiti)
- Mecyclothorax niho Liebherr, 2013 (Tahiti)
- Mecyclothorax ninamu Liebherr, 2013 (Tahiti)
- Mecyclothorax nitidus Liebherr, 2008
- Mecyclothorax notobscuricornis Liebherr, 2015 (Hawaii)
- Mecyclothorax nubicola (Blackburn, 1878) (Oceania)
- Mecyclothorax oahuensis (Blackburn, 1878) (Oceania)
- Mecyclothorax oaoa Liebherr, 2013 (Tahiti)
- Mecyclothorax obscuricolor (Blackburn, 1878) (Oceania)
- Mecyclothorax obscuricornis Sharp, 1903 (Oceania)
- Mecyclothorax obscurus Liebherr, 2006
- Mecyclothorax obtuseangulatus Baehr, 2014 (Indonesia and New Guinea)
- Mecyclothorax obtusus Perrault, 1984 (Tahiti)
- Mecyclothorax occultus Sharp, 1903 (Oceania)
- Mecyclothorax octavius Liebherr, 2018 (New Caledonia)
- Mecyclothorax oculatus Sharp, 1903 (Oceania and Hawaii)
- Mecyclothorax oculellus Liebherr, 2015 (Hawaii)
- Mecyclothorax ommatoplax Liebherr, 2015 (Hawaii)
- Mecyclothorax oopteroides Liebherr & Marris, 2009 (New Zealand)
- Mecyclothorax oppenheimeri Liebherr, 2011 (Hawaii)
- Mecyclothorax orbiculus Liebherr, 2015 (Hawaii)
- Mecyclothorax otagoensis Liebherr & Marris, 2009 (New Zealand)
- Mecyclothorax ovalipennis Perrault, 1988 (Tahiti)
- Mecyclothorax ovipennis Sharp, 1903 (Oceania)
- Mecyclothorax paahonu Liebherr, 2013 (Tahiti)
- Mecyclothorax pahere Liebherr, 2012 (Tahiti)
- Mecyclothorax palikea Liebherr & Krushelnycky, 2011 (Hawaii)
- Mecyclothorax pallidus Liebherr, 2011 (Hawaii)
- Mecyclothorax palustris (Sharp, 1903) (Oceania)
- Mecyclothorax palustroides Liebherr, 2015 (Hawaii)
- Mecyclothorax paniensis Liebherr, 2018 (New Caledonia)
- Mecyclothorax papau Liebherr, 2013 (Tahiti)
- Mecyclothorax papuhiti Liebherr, 2013 (Tahiti)
- Mecyclothorax paradoxus (Blackburn, 1879) (Oceania)
- Mecyclothorax paraglobosus Perrault, 1989 (Tahiti)
- Mecyclothorax paraltiusculus Perrault, 1988 (Tahiti)
- Mecyclothorax parapicalis Liebherr, 2015 (Hawaii)
- Mecyclothorax parovalipennis Perrault, 1988 (Tahiti)
- Mecyclothorax parvus Britton, 1948 (Oceania and Hawaii)
- Mecyclothorax patagiatus Liebherr, 2015 (Hawaii)
- Mecyclothorax patulus Liebherr, 2015 (Hawaii)
- Mecyclothorax pau Liebherr, 2015 (Hawaii)
- Mecyclothorax pele (Blackburn, 1879) (Oceania)
- Mecyclothorax perivariipes Liebherr, 2008
- Mecyclothorax perkinsi (Sharp, 1903) (Oceania)
- Mecyclothorax perkinsianus (Sharp, 1903) (Oceania)
- Mecyclothorax perpolitus Perkins, 1917 (Oceania)
- Mecyclothorax perraulti Liebherr, 2012 (Tahiti)
- Mecyclothorax perseveratus Liebherr, 2015 (Hawaii)
- Mecyclothorax perstriatus (Sharp, 1903) (Oceania)
- Mecyclothorax peryphoides (Blackburn, 1889) (Australia)
- Mecyclothorax picdupinsensis Liebherr, 2018 (New Caledonia)
- Mecyclothorax pirihao Liebherr, 2012 (Tahiti)
- Mecyclothorax pitohitiensis Liebherr, 2013 (Tahiti)
- Mecyclothorax placens (Broun, 1880) (New Zealand)
- Mecyclothorax planatus Liebherr, 2015 (Hawaii)
- Mecyclothorax planipennis Liebherr, 2015 (Hawaii)
- Mecyclothorax platops Liebherr, 2011 (Hawaii)
- Mecyclothorax platysminus (Sharp, 1903) (Oceania)
- Mecyclothorax plurisetosus Liebherr, 2018 (New Caledonia)
- Mecyclothorax polhemusi Liebherr, 2006
- Mecyclothorax pomarei Perrault, 1986 (Tahiti)
- Mecyclothorax poouli Liebherr, 2015 (Hawaii)
- Mecyclothorax popotioaoa Liebherr, 2012 (Tahiti)
- Mecyclothorax poria Liebherr, 2013 (Tahiti)
- Mecyclothorax poro Liebherr, 2012 (Tahiti)
- Mecyclothorax profondestriatus Perrault, 1989 (Tahiti)
- Mecyclothorax proximus Britton, 1948 (Oceania and Hawaii)
- Mecyclothorax pseudaltiusculus Perrault, 1988 (Tahiti)
- Mecyclothorax punakukini Liebherr, 2008
- Mecyclothorax punctatostriatus Liebherr, 2006
- Mecyclothorax punctatus (Sloane, 1895) (Australia)
- Mecyclothorax punctipennis (W.J.MacLeay, 1871) (Australia)
- Mecyclothorax purpuripennis Liebherr, 2008
- Mecyclothorax pusillus Sharp, 1903 (Oceania)
- Mecyclothorax putaputa Liebherr, 2012 (Tahiti)
- Mecyclothorax quadraticollis Perrault, 1984 (Tahiti)
- Mecyclothorax quadratus Britton, 1948 (Oceania and Hawaii)
- Mecyclothorax rahimata Liebherr, 2013 (Tahiti)
- Mecyclothorax ramagei Liebherr, 2013 (Tahiti)
- Mecyclothorax rectangulus Louwerens, 1953 (Indonesia)
- Mecyclothorax rectus (Liebherr, 2011) (New Zealand)
- Mecyclothorax refulgens Liebherr, 2015 (Hawaii)
- Mecyclothorax reidi Baehr, 2017 (Indonesia)
- Mecyclothorax reiteratus Liebherr, 2015 (Hawaii)
- Mecyclothorax rex Liebherr, 2015 (Hawaii)
- Mecyclothorax riedeli Baehr, 1992 (Indonesia and New Guinea)
- Mecyclothorax robustus (Blackburn, 1881) (Oceania)
- Mecyclothorax rotundatus Lorenz, 1998
- Mecyclothorax rotundicollis (White, 1846) (New Zealand)
- Mecyclothorax rufipennis Liebherr, 2008
- Mecyclothorax rusticus Sharp, 1903 (Oceania)
- Mecyclothorax sabulicola Britton, 1948 (Tahiti)
- Mecyclothorax sapei Baehr, 1995 (Indonesia and New Guinea)
- Mecyclothorax scapulatus Liebherr, 2011 (Hawaii)
- Mecyclothorax scarites Liebherr, 2015 (Hawaii)
- Mecyclothorax scaritoides (Blackburn, 1878) (Oceania)
- Mecyclothorax sculptonotatus (Enderlein, 1909)
- Mecyclothorax sedlaceki Darlington, 1971 (New Guinea and Papua)
- Mecyclothorax semistriatus Liebherr, 2015 (Hawaii)
- Mecyclothorax sharpi Britton, 1948 (Oceania and Hawaii)
- Mecyclothorax simiolus (Blackburn, 1878) (Oceania)
- Mecyclothorax simpulum Liebherr, 2015 (Hawaii)
- Mecyclothorax sinuatus Perrault, 1988 (Tahiti)
- Mecyclothorax sinuosus Liebherr, 2008
- Mecyclothorax sobrinus Sharp, 1903 (Oceania)
- Mecyclothorax spiculatus (Liebherr, 2011) (New Zealand)
- Mecyclothorax spinosus Perrault, 1989 (Tahiti)
- Mecyclothorax splendidus Liebherr, 2015 (Hawaii)
- Mecyclothorax stenolophinus Liebherr, 2006
- Mecyclothorax storeyi B.Moore, 1984 (Australia)
- Mecyclothorax striatopunctatus Perrault, 1986 (Tahiti)
- Mecyclothorax strigosus Liebherr, 2015 (Hawaii)
- Mecyclothorax subater Liebherr, 2006
- Mecyclothorax subconstrictus (Sharp, 1903) (Oceania)
- Mecyclothorax subquadratus Perrault, 1984 (Tahiti)
- Mecyclothorax subsinuatus Liebherr, 2006
- Mecyclothorax subternus Liebherr, 2015 (Hawaii)
- Mecyclothorax subtilis Liebherr, 2015 (Hawaii)
- Mecyclothorax subunctus (Perkins, 1917) (Oceania)
- Mecyclothorax superstriatus Liebherr, 2005
- Mecyclothorax swezeyi Liebherr, 2008
- Mecyclothorax taatitore Liebherr, 2013 (Tahiti)
- Mecyclothorax tahitiensis Perrault, 1978 (Tahiti)
- Mecyclothorax taiarapu Perrault, 1989 (Tahiti)
- Mecyclothorax takumiae Liebherr, 2015 (Hawaii)
- Mecyclothorax tantalus Britton, 1948 (Oceania and Hawaii)
- Mecyclothorax tauberorum Liebherr, 2015 (Hawaii)
- Mecyclothorax teatara Perrault, 1986 (Tahiti)
- Mecyclothorax terminalis (Sharp, 1903) (Oceania)
- Mecyclothorax tihotii Liebherr, 2012 (Tahiti)
- Mecyclothorax timberlakei Liebherr, 2015 (Hawaii)
- Mecyclothorax timorensis Baehr, 2017 (Indonesia)
- Mecyclothorax toretore Liebherr, 2012 (Tahiti)
- Mecyclothorax toxopei Darlington, 1962 (Indonesia and New Guinea)
- Mecyclothorax trisetifer Liebherr, 2006
- Mecyclothorax tuberculatus Perrault, 1988 (Tahiti)
- Mecyclothorax tuea Liebherr, 2013 (Tahiti)
- Mecyclothorax tutei Liebherr, 2012 (Tahiti)
- Mecyclothorax unctus (Blackburn, 1881)
- Mecyclothorax ustulatus Liebherr, 2011 (Hawaii)
- Mecyclothorax vaifaufa Perrault, 1989 (Tahiti)
- Mecyclothorax variipes (Sharp, 1903) (Oceania)
- Mecyclothorax vicinus Liebherr, 2011 (Hawaii)
- Mecyclothorax villiersi Perrault, 1986 (Tahiti)
- Mecyclothorax viridis Perrault, 1978 (Tahiti)
- Mecyclothorax vitreus Britton, 1948 (Oceania)
- Mecyclothorax vulcanoides Liebherr, 2011 (Hawaii)
- Mecyclothorax vulcanus (Blackburn, 1879) (Oceania)
- Mecyclothorax waikamoi Liebherr, 2015 (Hawaii)
- Mecyclothorax wallisi Perrault, 1986 (Tahiti)
- Mecyclothorax williamsi Liebherr, 2008
- Mecyclothorax xestos Liebherr, 2015 (Hawaii)
- Mecyclothorax zimmermani Perrault, 1978 (Tahiti)
