= Mecyclothorax perpolitus =

Scientific classification
- Domain: Eukaryota
- Kingdom: Animalia
- Phylum: Arthropoda
- Class: Insecta
- Order: Coleoptera
- Suborder: Adephaga
- Family: Carabidae
- Genus: Mecyclothorax
- Species: M. perpolitus

Binomial name
- Mecyclothorax perpolitus Perkins, 1917

Species of beetle

Mecyclothorax perpolitus is a species of ground beetle in the subfamily Psydrinae. It was described by Perkins in 1917.
