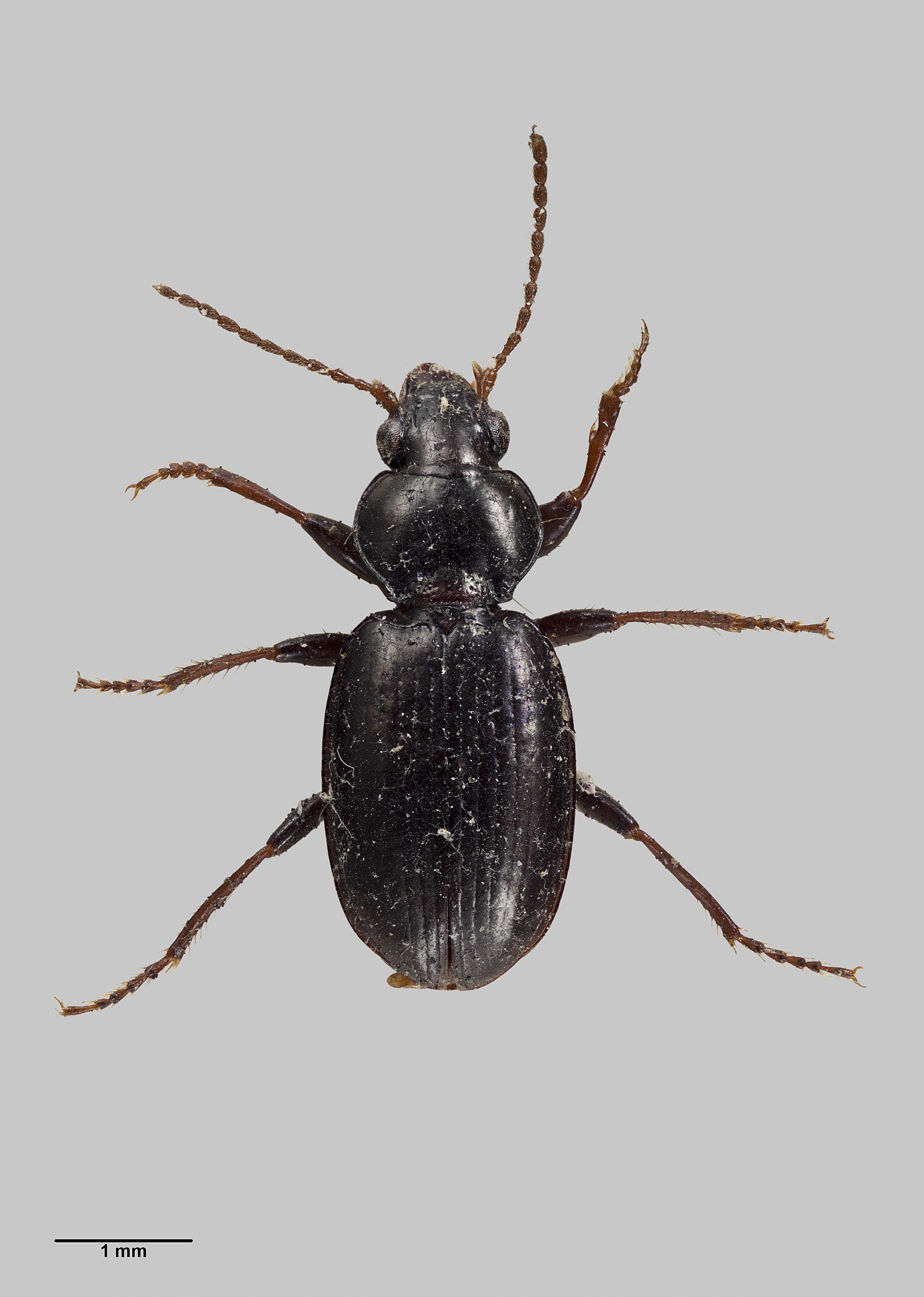
- Mecyclothorax otagoensis (Liebherr & Marris, 2009) holotype specimen held at Auckland Museum licensed under CC BY 4.0.

Scientific classification
- Kingdom: Animalia
- Phylum: Arthropoda
- Class: Insecta
- Order: Coleoptera
- Suborder: Adephaga
- Family: Carabidae
- Genus: Mecyclothorax
- Species: M. otagoensis

Binomial name
- Mecyclothorax otagoensis Liebherr & Marris, 2009

= Mecyclothorax otagoensis =

Species of beetle

Mecyclothorax otagoensis is a species of ground beetle in the subfamily Psydrinae. It was described by Liebherr & Marris in 2009.
