= Mecyclothorax karschi =

Scientific classification
- Domain: Eukaryota
- Kingdom: Animalia
- Phylum: Arthropoda
- Class: Insecta
- Order: Coleoptera
- Suborder: Adephaga
- Family: Carabidae
- Genus: Mecyclothorax
- Species: M. karschi

Binomial name
- Mecyclothorax karschi (Blackburn, 1882)

Synonyms
- Mecyclothorax munroi (Perkins, 1937)

Species of beetle

Mecyclothorax karschi is a species of ground beetle in the subfamily Psydrinae. It was described by Blackburn in 1882.
