= Mecyclothorax gagnei =

Scientific classification
- Kingdom: Animalia
- Phylum: Arthropoda
- Class: Insecta
- Order: Coleoptera
- Suborder: Adephaga
- Family: Carabidae
- Genus: Mecyclothorax
- Species: M. gagnei

Binomial name
- Mecyclothorax gagnei Liebherr, 2008

Species of beetle

Mecyclothorax gagnei is a species of ground beetle in the subfamily Psydrinae. It was described by Liebherr in 2008.
