= Mecyclothorax bryobius =

Scientific classification
- Domain: Eukaryota
- Kingdom: Animalia
- Phylum: Arthropoda
- Class: Insecta
- Order: Coleoptera
- Suborder: Adephaga
- Family: Carabidae
- Genus: Mecyclothorax
- Species: M. bryobius

Binomial name
- Mecyclothorax bryobius (Britton, 1938)

Species of beetle

Mecyclothorax bryobius is a species of ground beetle in the subfamily Psydrinae. It was described by Britton in 1938.
