= Mecyclothorax howei =

Scientific classification
- Domain: Eukaryota
- Kingdom: Animalia
- Phylum: Arthropoda
- Class: Insecta
- Order: Coleoptera
- Suborder: Adephaga
- Family: Carabidae
- Genus: Mecyclothorax
- Species: M. howei

Binomial name
- Mecyclothorax howei Moore, 1992

Species of beetle

Mecyclothorax howei is a species of ground beetle in the subfamily Psydrinae. It was described by Barry P. Moore in 1992.
