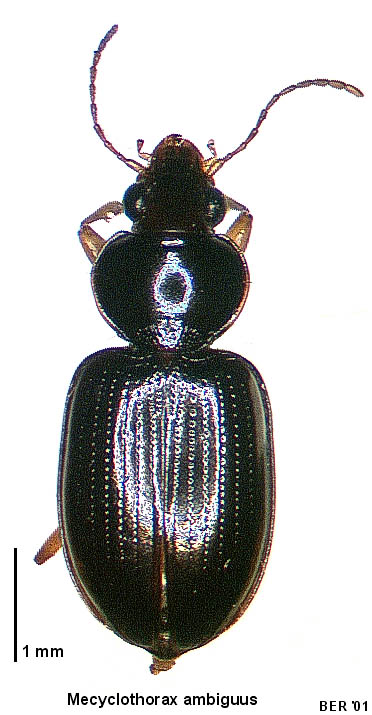

Scientific classification
- Kingdom: Animalia
- Phylum: Arthropoda
- Class: Insecta
- Order: Coleoptera
- Suborder: Adephaga
- Family: Carabidae
- Genus: Mecyclothorax
- Species: M. ambiguus

Binomial name
- Mecyclothorax ambiguus (Erichson, 1842)

= Mecyclothorax ambiguus =

Species of beetle

Mecyclothorax ambiguus is a species of ground beetle in the subfamily Psydrinae. It was described by Wilhelm Ferdinand Erichson in 1842.
