= Mecyclothorax convexicollis =

Scientific classification
- Domain: Eukaryota
- Kingdom: Animalia
- Phylum: Arthropoda
- Class: Insecta
- Order: Coleoptera
- Suborder: Adephaga
- Family: Carabidae
- Genus: Mecyclothorax
- Species: M. convexicollis

Binomial name
- Mecyclothorax convexicollis (Emden, 1937)

Species of beetle

Mecyclothorax convexicollis is a species of ground beetle in the subfamily Psydrinae. It was described by Emden in 1937.
