= Mecyclothorax lophoides =

Scientific classification
- Domain: Eukaryota
- Kingdom: Animalia
- Phylum: Arthropoda
- Class: Insecta
- Order: Coleoptera
- Suborder: Adephaga
- Family: Carabidae
- Genus: Mecyclothorax
- Species: M. lophoides

Binomial name
- Mecyclothorax lophoides (Chaudoir, 1854)

Species of beetle

Mecyclothorax lophoides is a species of ground beetle in the subfamily Psydrinae. It was described by Maximilien Chaudoir in 1854.
