= Mecyclothorax basipunctus =

Scientific classification
- Domain: Eukaryota
- Kingdom: Animalia
- Phylum: Arthropoda
- Class: Insecta
- Order: Coleoptera
- Suborder: Adephaga
- Family: Carabidae
- Genus: Mecyclothorax
- Species: M. basipunctus

Binomial name
- Mecyclothorax basipunctus Louwerens, 1953

Species of beetle

Mecyclothorax basipunctus is a species of ground beetle in the subfamily Psydrinae. It was described by C.J. Louwerens in 1953.
