= Mecyclothorax cupripennis =

Scientific classification
- Domain: Eukaryota
- Kingdom: Animalia
- Phylum: Arthropoda
- Class: Insecta
- Order: Coleoptera
- Suborder: Adephaga
- Family: Carabidae
- Genus: Mecyclothorax
- Species: M. cupripennis

Binomial name
- Mecyclothorax cupripennis Perrault, 1989

Species of beetle

Mecyclothorax cupripennis is a species of ground beetle in the subfamily Psydrinae. It was described by Perrault in 1989.
