= Mecyclothorax deverilli =

Scientific classification
- Domain: Eukaryota
- Kingdom: Animalia
- Phylum: Arthropoda
- Class: Insecta
- Order: Coleoptera
- Suborder: Adephaga
- Family: Carabidae
- Genus: Mecyclothorax
- Species: M. deverilli

Binomial name
- Mecyclothorax deverilli (Blackburn, 1879)

Species of beetle

Mecyclothorax deverilli is a species of ground beetle in the subfamily Psydrinae. It was described by Blackburn in 1879.
