= Mecyclothorax cupreoides =

Scientific classification
- Domain: Eukaryota
- Kingdom: Animalia
- Phylum: Arthropoda
- Class: Insecta
- Order: Coleoptera
- Suborder: Adephaga
- Family: Carabidae
- Genus: Mecyclothorax
- Species: M. cupreoides

Binomial name
- Mecyclothorax cupreoides Perrault, 1978

Species of beetle

Mecyclothorax cupreoides is a species of ground beetle in the subfamily Psydrinae. It was described by Perrault in 1978.
