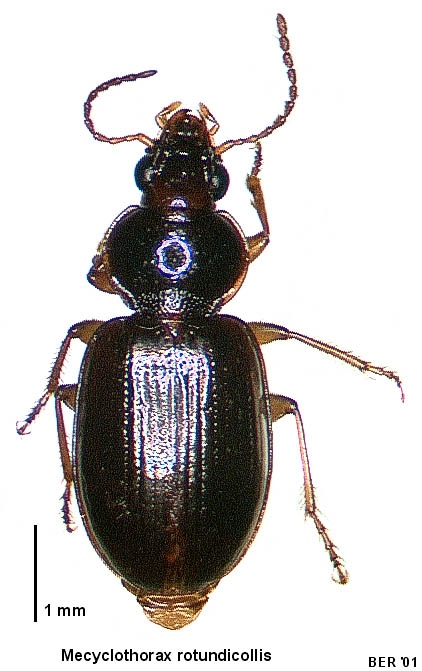

Scientific classification
- Domain: Eukaryota
- Kingdom: Animalia
- Phylum: Arthropoda
- Class: Insecta
- Order: Coleoptera
- Suborder: Adephaga
- Family: Carabidae
- Genus: Mecyclothorax
- Species: M. rotundicollis

Binomial name
- Mecyclothorax rotundicollis (White, 1846)

= Mecyclothorax rotundicollis =

Species of beetle

Mecyclothorax rotundicollis is a species of ground beetle in the subfamily Psydrinae. It is endemic to New Zealand. It was described by White in 1846.
