= Mecyclothorax sculptonotatus =

Scientific classification
- Domain: Eukaryota
- Kingdom: Animalia
- Phylum: Arthropoda
- Class: Insecta
- Order: Coleoptera
- Suborder: Adephaga
- Family: Carabidae
- Genus: Mecyclothorax
- Species: M. sculptonotatus

Binomial name
- Mecyclothorax sculptonotatus (Enderlein, 1909)

Species of beetle

Mecyclothorax sculptonotatus is a species of ground beetle in the subfamily Psydrinae. It was described by Enderlein in 1909.
