= Mecyclothorax globicollis =

Scientific classification
- Kingdom: Animalia
- Phylum: Arthropoda
- Clade: Pancrustacea
- Class: Insecta
- Order: Coleoptera
- Suborder: Adephaga
- Family: Carabidae
- Genus: Mecyclothorax
- Species: M. globicollis

Binomial name
- Mecyclothorax globicollis (Mandl, 1969)

Species of beetle

Mecyclothorax globicollis is a species of ground beetle in the subfamily Psydrinae. It was described by Mandl in 1969.
