= Amblytelus niger =

Scientific classification
- Kingdom: Animalia
- Phylum: Arthropoda
- Class: Insecta
- Order: Coleoptera
- Suborder: Adephaga
- Family: Carabidae
- Genus: Amblytelus
- Species: A. niger

Binomial name
- Amblytelus niger Sloane, 1920

Species of beetle

Amblytelus niger is a species of ground beetle in the subfamily Psydrinae. It was described by Sloane in 1920.

== See also ==
- Amblytelus
  - Amblytelus balli
  - Amblytelus cooki
- Psydrinae
- Carabidae
