= Mecyclothorax rufipennis =

Scientific classification
- Kingdom: Animalia
- Phylum: Arthropoda
- Class: Insecta
- Order: Coleoptera
- Suborder: Adephaga
- Family: Carabidae
- Genus: Mecyclothorax
- Species: M. rufipennis

Binomial name
- Mecyclothorax rufipennis Liebherr, 2008

Species of beetle

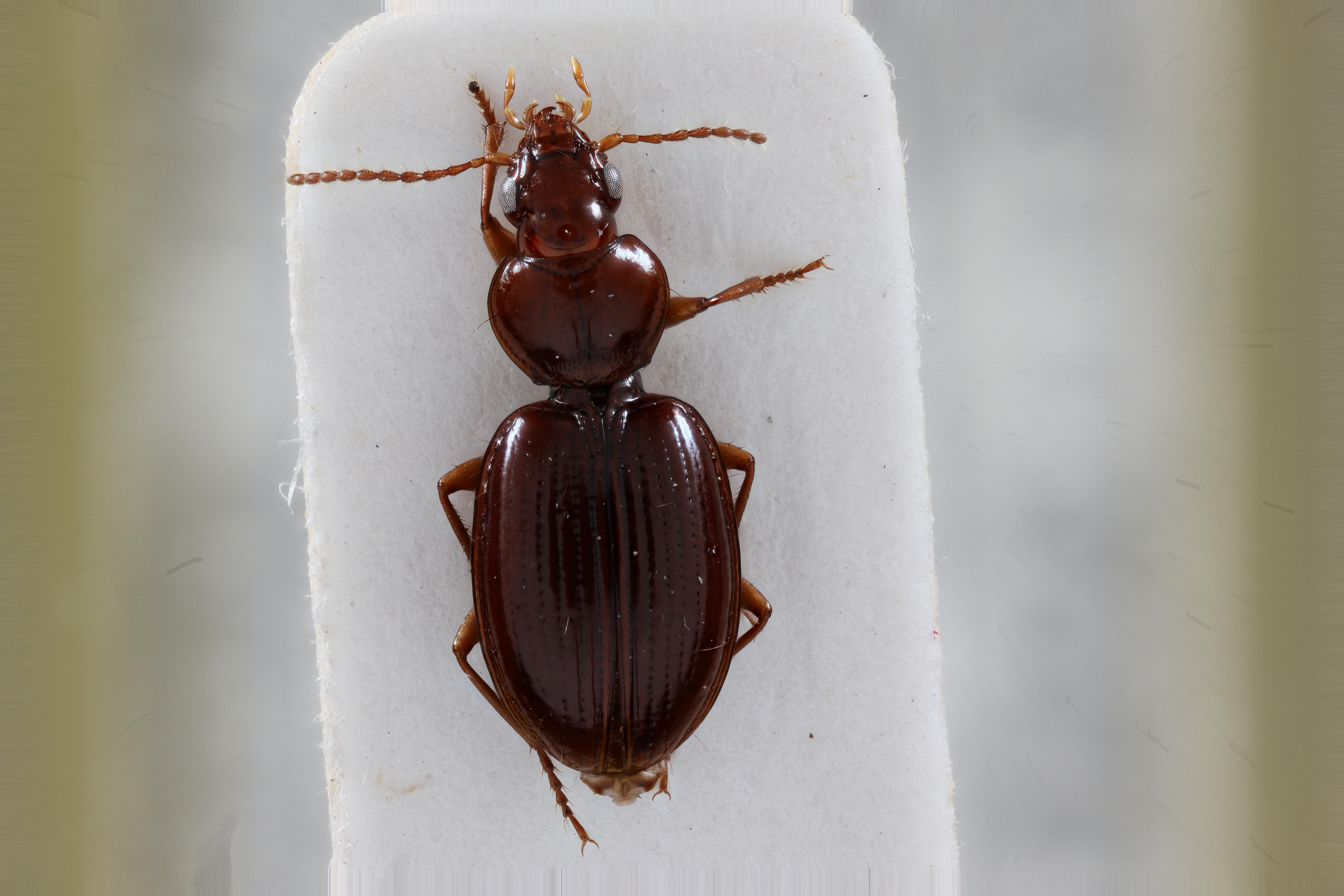

Mecyclothorax rufipennis is a species of ground beetle in the subfamily Psydrinae. It was described by Liebherr in 2008. Described as a small pale beetle with a standardized body length 4.0–4.9 mm. Elytra parallel-sided with striae 1–5 continuous with punctures present and stria 6 obsolete but traceable near elytral midlength. Elytra covered with more distinct transverse microsculpture consisting of very transverse sculpticells and transverse lines. Pronotum possesses basolateral seti. This species is known from the Kohala Mts. and windward forests on Mauna Loa. If this species' distribution is congruent with other occupants of the windward wet forests, populations on Mauna Kea are predicted. This species to tell apart from Mecyclothorax konanus without dissection, as there is much overlap in size, color and external traits.
