= Dystrichothorax bernhardti =

Scientific classification
- Kingdom: Animalia
- Phylum: Arthropoda
- Class: Insecta
- Order: Coleoptera
- Suborder: Adephaga
- Family: Carabidae
- Genus: Dystrichothorax
- Species: D. bernhardti

Binomial name
- Dystrichothorax bernhardti Baehr, 2004

Species of beetle

Dystrichothorax bernhardti is a species of ground beetle classified within the subfamily Psydrinae. It was formally described by Baehr in 2004. The species is part of the genus Dystrichothorax, which includes various ground beetles known for their diverse habitats and ecological roles.

== Research studies ==
- The species has been included in various entomological studies and databases, highlighting its ecological importance and providing data on its distribution and habitat preferences.
- An annotated list of Coleoptera, including Dystrichothorax bernhardti, has been compiled from specific regions, providing insights into its ecological interactions and diversity within its habitat
