= Dystrichothorax amplipennis =

Scientific classification
- Kingdom: Animalia
- Phylum: Arthropoda
- Class: Insecta
- Order: Coleoptera
- Suborder: Adephaga
- Family: Carabidae
- Genus: Dystrichothorax
- Species: D. amplipennis

Binomial name
- Dystrichothorax amplipennis W. J. Macleay, 1871

Species of beetle

Dystrichothorax amplipennis is a species of ground beetle in the subfamily Psydrinae. It was described by William John Macleay in 1871.
