= Amblytelus discoidalis =

Scientific classification
- Domain: Eukaryota
- Kingdom: Animalia
- Phylum: Arthropoda
- Class: Insecta
- Order: Coleoptera
- Suborder: Adephaga
- Family: Carabidae
- Genus: Amblytelus
- Species: A. discoidalis

Binomial name
- Amblytelus discoidalis Blackburn, 1891

Species of beetle

Amblytelus discoidalis is a species of ground beetle in the subfamily Psydrinae. It was described by Blackburn in 1891.
