= Amblytelus sinuatus =

Scientific classification
- Domain: Eukaryota
- Kingdom: Animalia
- Phylum: Arthropoda
- Class: Insecta
- Order: Coleoptera
- Suborder: Adephaga
- Family: Carabidae
- Genus: Amblytelus
- Species: A. sinuatus

Binomial name
- Amblytelus sinuatus Blackburn, 1892

Species of beetle

Amblytelus sinuatus is a species of ground beetle in the subfamily Psydrinae. It was described by Blackburn in 1892.
