= Nomius =

Nomius may refer to:

- Nomius (Νόμιος; "The Pasturer"), an epithet applied to deities who safeguard pastures and shepherds, including Apollo, Pan, Hermes, and Aristaeus.
- Nomius (beetle), a genus of ground beetles
