= Amblytelus inornatus =

Scientific classification
- Domain: Eukaryota
- Kingdom: Animalia
- Phylum: Arthropoda
- Class: Insecta
- Order: Coleoptera
- Suborder: Adephaga
- Family: Carabidae
- Genus: Amblytelus
- Species: A. inornatus

Binomial name
- Amblytelus inornatus Blackburn, 1891

Species of beetle

Amblytelus inornatus is a species of ground beetle in the subfamily Psydrinae. It was described by Blackburn in 1891.

== See also ==
- Amblytelus
- Carabidae
