= Dystrichothorax vittipennis =

Scientific classification
- Kingdom: Animalia
- Phylum: Arthropoda
- Class: Insecta
- Order: Coleoptera
- Suborder: Adephaga
- Family: Carabidae
- Genus: Dystrichothorax
- Species: D. vittipennis

Binomial name
- Dystrichothorax vittipennis Sloane, 1911

Species of beetle

Dystrichothorax vittipennis is a species of ground beetle in the subfamily Psydrinae. It was described by Sloane in 1911.
