= Amblytelus simsoni =

Scientific classification
- Kingdom: Animalia
- Phylum: Arthropoda
- Class: Insecta
- Order: Coleoptera
- Suborder: Adephaga
- Family: Carabidae
- Genus: Amblytelus
- Species: A. simsoni

Binomial name
- Amblytelus simsoni Sloane, 1920

Species of beetle

Amblytelus simsoni is a species of ground beetle in the subfamily Psydrinae. It was described by Sloane in 1920.
