= Amblytelus striatus =

Scientific classification
- Kingdom: Animalia
- Phylum: Arthropoda
- Class: Insecta
- Order: Coleoptera
- Suborder: Adephaga
- Family: Carabidae
- Genus: Amblytelus
- Species: A. striatus

Binomial name
- Amblytelus striatus Sloane, 1920

Species of beetle

Amblytelus striatus is a species of ground beetle in the subfamily Psydrinae. It was described by Sloane in 1920.
