= Dystrichothorax lividus =

Scientific classification
- Domain: Eukaryota
- Kingdom: Animalia
- Phylum: Arthropoda
- Class: Insecta
- Order: Coleoptera
- Suborder: Adephaga
- Family: Carabidae
- Genus: Dystrichothorax
- Species: D. lividus

Binomial name
- Dystrichothorax lividus Blackburn, 1892

Species of beetle

Dystrichothorax lividus is a species of ground beetle in the subfamily Psydrinae. It was described by Blackburn in 1892.
