= Amblytelus brunnicolor =

Scientific classification
- Kingdom: Animalia
- Phylum: Arthropoda
- Class: Insecta
- Order: Coleoptera
- Suborder: Adephaga
- Family: Carabidae
- Genus: Amblytelus
- Species: A. brunnicolor

Binomial name
- Amblytelus brunnicolor Sloane, 1898

Species of beetle

Amblytelus brunnicolor is a species of ground beetle in the subfamily Psydrinae. It was described by Sloane in 1898.
