= Amblytelus curtus =

Scientific classification
- Domain: Eukaryota
- Kingdom: Animalia
- Phylum: Arthropoda
- Class: Insecta
- Order: Coleoptera
- Suborder: Adephaga
- Family: Carabidae
- Genus: Amblytelus
- Species: A. curtus

Binomial name
- Amblytelus curtus (Fabricius, 1801)

Species of beetle

Amblytelus curtus is a species of ground beetle in the subfamily Psydrinae. It was described by Johan Christian Fabricius in 1801.
