= Neonomius ovalis =

Scientific classification
- Kingdom: Animalia
- Phylum: Arthropoda
- Class: Insecta
- Order: Coleoptera
- Suborder: Adephaga
- Family: Carabidae
- Subfamily: Psydrinae
- Tribe: Moriomorphini
- Subtribe: Moriomorphina
- Genus: Neonomius
- Species: N. ovalis

Binomial name
- Neonomius ovalis (Sloane, 1915)

Synonyms
- Mecyclothorax ovalis Sloane, 1915

Species of beetle

Neonomius ovalis is a species of ground beetle in the family Carabidae. It is found in Australia.
