= Dystrichothorax victoriae =

Scientific classification
- Domain: Eukaryota
- Kingdom: Animalia
- Phylum: Arthropoda
- Class: Insecta
- Order: Coleoptera
- Suborder: Adephaga
- Family: Carabidae
- Genus: Dystrichothorax
- Species: D. victoriae

Binomial name
- Dystrichothorax victoriae Baehr, 2004

Species of beetle

Dystrichothorax victoriae is a species of ground beetle in the subfamily Psydrinae. It was described by Baehr in 2004.
