= Amblytelus marginicollis =

Scientific classification
- Kingdom: Animalia
- Phylum: Arthropoda
- Class: Insecta
- Order: Coleoptera
- Suborder: Adephaga
- Family: Carabidae
- Genus: Amblytelus
- Species: A. marginicollis

Binomial name
- Amblytelus marginicollis Sloane, 1911

Species of beetle

Amblytelus marginicollis is a species of ground beetle in the subfamily Psydrinae. It was described by Sloane in 1911. Located in Australia.
