= Dystrichothorax australis =

Scientific classification
- Kingdom: Animalia
- Phylum: Arthropoda
- Class: Insecta
- Order: Coleoptera
- Suborder: Adephaga
- Family: Carabidae
- Genus: Dystrichothorax
- Species: D. australis

Binomial name
- Dystrichothorax australis (Erichson, 1842)

Species of beetle

Dystrichothorax australis is a species of ground beetle in the subfamily Psydrinae. It was described by Wilhelm Ferdinand Erichson in 1842.
