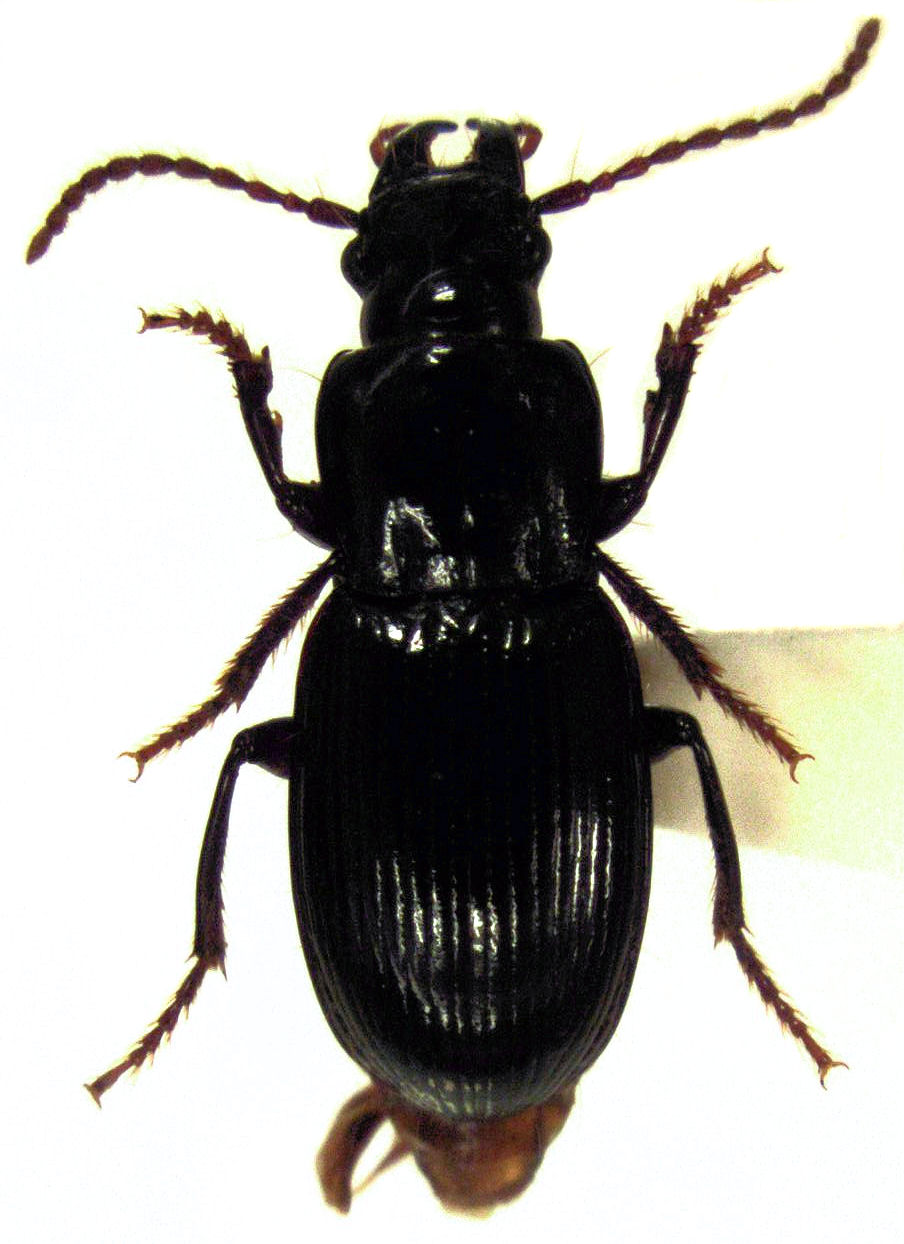
- Selenochilus omalleyi (male, length about 5 mm)

Scientific classification
- Domain: Eukaryota
- Kingdom: Animalia
- Phylum: Arthropoda
- Class: Insecta
- Order: Coleoptera
- Suborder: Adephaga
- Family: Carabidae
- Genus: Selenochilus
- Species: S. omalleyi

Binomial name
- Selenochilus omalleyi Larochelle & Larivière, 2013

= Selenochilus omalleyi =

Selenochilus

Species of beetle

Selenochilus omalleyi is a species of beetle in the family Carabidae, endemic to New Zealand.
