= Helenaea =

Scientific classification
- Domain: Eukaryota
- Kingdom: Animalia
- Phylum: Arthropoda
- Class: Insecta
- Order: Coleoptera
- Suborder: Adephaga
- Family: Carabidae
- Subfamily: Psydrinae
- Tribe: Gehringiini
- Subtribe: Helenaeina
- Genus: Helenaea; Schatzmayr & Koch, 1934

Genus of beetles

Helenaea is a genus of carabids in the beetle family Carabidae. There are at least three described species in Helenaea.

== Species ==
These three species belong to the genus Helenaea:

- Helenaea bisignata Baehr, 2003 (Turkey)
- Helenaea felixi Deuve, 2007 (Yemen)
- Helenaea torretassoi Schatzmayr & Koch, 1934 (Egypt)
