= Moriomorpha =

Scientific classification
- Domain: Eukaryota
- Kingdom: Animalia
- Phylum: Arthropoda
- Class: Insecta
- Order: Coleoptera
- Suborder: Adephaga
- Family: Carabidae
- Subfamily: Psydrinae
- Tribe: Moriomorphini
- Subtribe: Moriomorphina
- Genus: Moriomorpha; Laporte, 1867

Genus of beetles

Moriomorpha is a genus in the beetle family Carabidae. There are about six described species in Moriomorpha, found in Australia.

== Species ==
These six species belong to the genus Moriomorpha:

- Moriomorpha adelaidae Laporte, 1867
- Moriomorpha curvipes Baehr, 2011
- Moriomorpha dorrigo Baehr, 2011
- Moriomorpha lawrencei Baehr, 2011
- Moriomorpha macrops Baehr, 2011
- Moriomorpha victoriae Laporte, 1867
