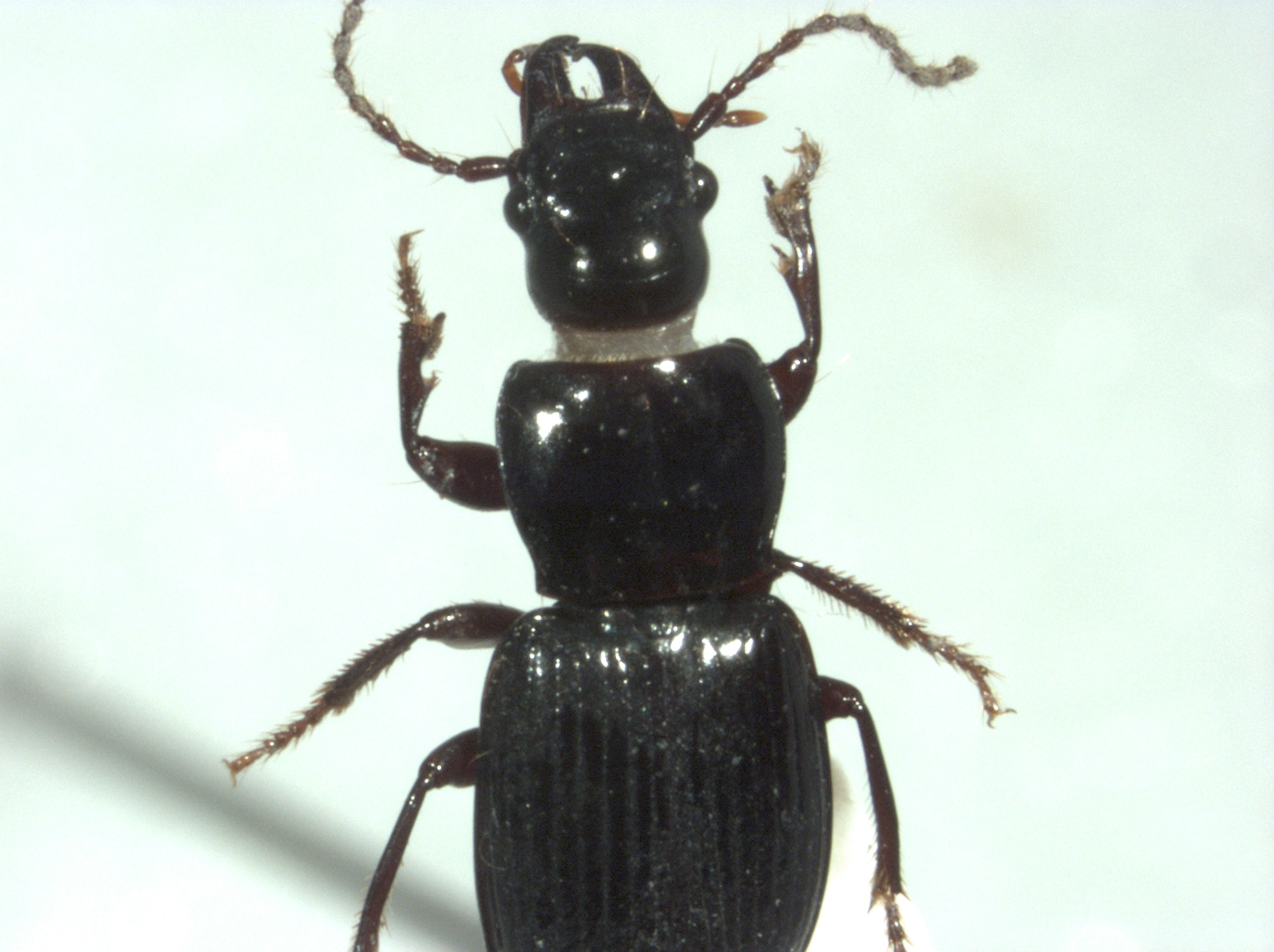
- Selenochilus oculator

Scientific classification
- Kingdom: Animalia
- Phylum: Arthropoda
- Class: Insecta
- Order: Coleoptera
- Suborder: Adephaga
- Family: Carabidae
- Genus: Selenochilus
- Species: S. oculator

Binomial name
- Selenochilus oculator (Broun, 1893)

= Selenochilus oculator =

Selenochilus

Species of beetle

Selenochilus oculator is a species of beetle in the family Carabidae, endemic to New Zealand, known only from the holotype, reportedly collected at Hunua Range, Auckland.
