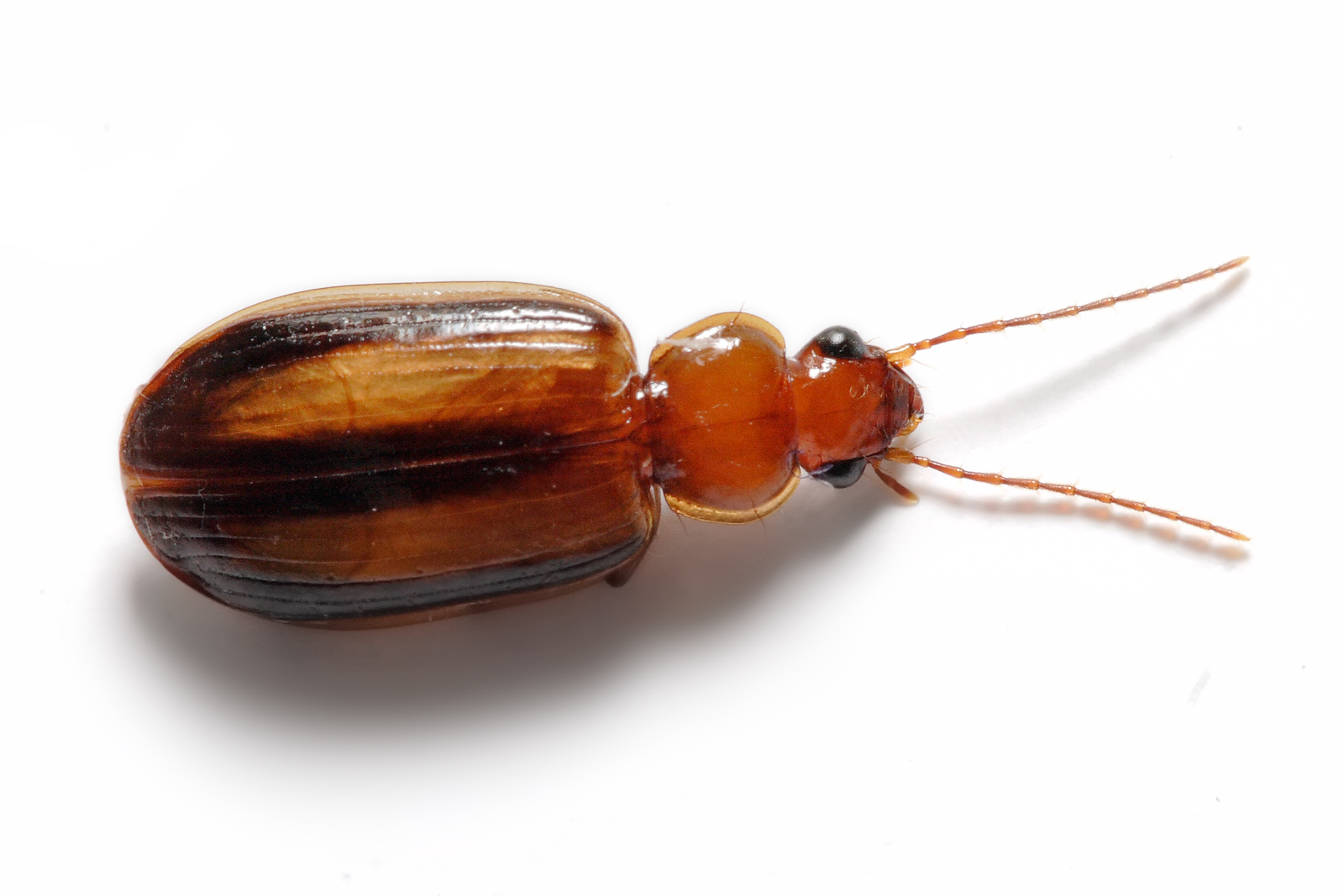

Scientific classification
- Kingdom: Animalia
- Phylum: Arthropoda
- Class: Insecta
- Order: Coleoptera
- Suborder: Adephaga
- Superfamily: Caraboidea
- Family: Carabidae
- Subfamily: Psydrinae
- Genus: Amblytelus; Erichson, 1842

= Amblytelus =

Genus of beetles

Amblytelus is a genus of ground beetle including 44 species distributed through southern Australia, including the Southwest and along the east coast up to North Queensland.

== Species ==
These 44 species belong to the genus Amblytelus:

- Amblytelus balli Baehr, 2004
- Amblytelus barringtonensis Baehr, 2004
- Amblytelus bathurstensis Baehr, 2004
- Amblytelus bellorum Baehr, 2004
- Amblytelus bistriatus Baehr, 2004
- Amblytelus brevis Blackburn, 1892
- Amblytelus brunnicolor Sloane, 1898
- Amblytelus calderi Baehr, 2004
- Amblytelus castaneus Baehr, 2004
- Amblytelus cooki Baehr, 2004
- Amblytelus curtus (Fabricius, 1801)
- Amblytelus discoidalis Blackburn, 1891
- Amblytelus doyeni Baehr, 2004
- Amblytelus fallax Baehr, 2006
- Amblytelus geoffreyorum Baehr, 2004
- Amblytelus gloriosus Baehr, 2004
- Amblytelus handkei Baehr, 2004
- Amblytelus inornatus Blackburn, 1891
- Amblytelus karricola Baehr, 2004
- Amblytelus lawrencei Baehr, 2004
- Amblytelus leai Sloane, 1898
- Amblytelus longior Baehr, 2004
- Amblytelus longipennis Baehr, 2004
- Amblytelus marginicollis Sloane, 1911
- Amblytelus matthewsi Baehr, 2004
- Amblytelus meyeri Baehr, 2004
- Amblytelus minutus W.J.MacLeay, 1871
- Amblytelus monteithi Baehr, 2004
- Amblytelus montiscampi Baehr, 2004
- Amblytelus montiswilsoni Baehr, 2004
- Amblytelus montorum Baehr, 2004
- Amblytelus neboissi Baehr, 2004
- Amblytelus niger Sloane, 1920
- Amblytelus observatorum Baehr, 2004
- Amblytelus pseudepelyx Baehr, 2004
- Amblytelus rugosifrons Baehr, 2004
- Amblytelus simsoni Sloane, 1920
- Amblytelus sinuatus Blackburn, 1892
- Amblytelus spurgeoni Baehr, 2004
- Amblytelus striatus Sloane, 1920
- Amblytelus suturalis Baehr, 2016
- Amblytelus temporalis Baehr, 2004
- Amblytelus walfordi Baehr, 2004
- Amblytelus weiri Baehr, 2004
