= Neonomius =

Scientific classification
- Domain: Eukaryota
- Kingdom: Animalia
- Phylum: Arthropoda
- Class: Insecta
- Order: Coleoptera
- Suborder: Adephaga
- Family: Carabidae
- Subfamily: Psydrinae
- Tribe: Moriomorphini
- Subtribe: Moriomorphina
- Genus: Neonomius; B.Moore, 1963

Genus of beetles

Neonomius is a genus in the beetle family Carabidae. There are about seven described species in Neonomius, found in Australia.

== Species ==
These seven species belong to the genus Neonomius:

- Neonomius australis (Sloane, 1915)
- Neonomius avonensis Liebherr, 2019
- Neonomius baehri Liebherr, 2019
- Neonomius laevicollis (Sloane, 1915)
- Neonomius laticollis (Sloane, 1900)
- Neonomius leai Liebherr, 2019
- Neonomius ovalis (Sloane, 1915)
