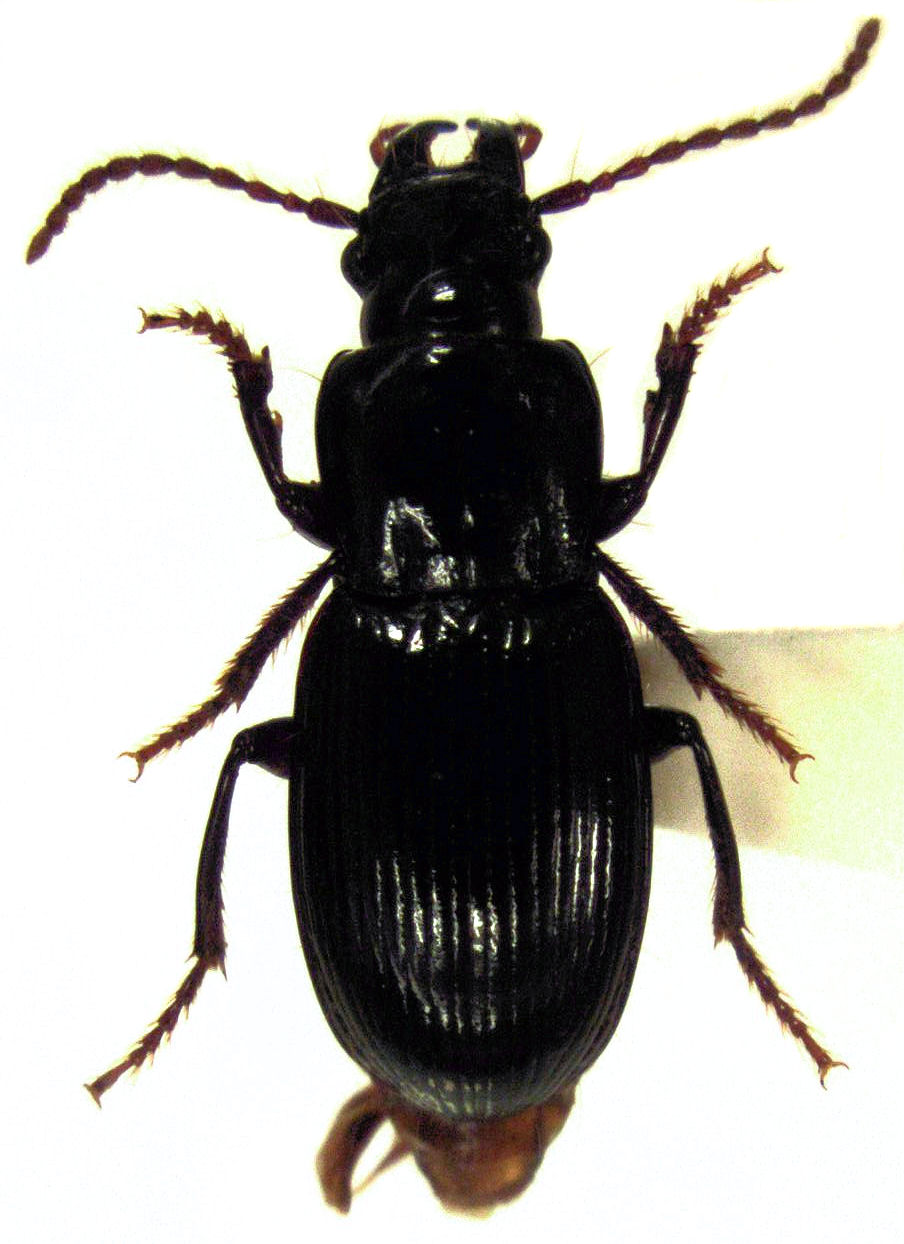
- Selenochilus omalleyi (male, length about 5 mm)

Scientific classification
- Domain: Eukaryota
- Kingdom: Animalia
- Phylum: Arthropoda
- Class: Insecta
- Order: Coleoptera
- Suborder: Adephaga
- Family: Carabidae
- Subfamily: Psydrinae
- Genus: Selenochilus; Chaudoir, 1878

= Selenochilus =

Genus of beetles

Selenochilus is a genus of beetles in the family Carabidae, endemic to New Zealand, including the following seven species:

- Selenochilus hinewai Larochelle & Larivière, 2013
- Selenochilus hutchisonae Larochelle & Larivière, 2013
- Selenochilus oculator (Broun, 1893)
- Selenochilus omalleyi Larochelle & Larivière, 2013
- Selenochilus piceus (Blanchard, 1843)
- Selenochilus ruficornis (Broun, 1882)
- Selenochilus syntheticus (Sharp, 1886)
