= Epelyx =

Scientific classification
- Domain: Eukaryota
- Kingdom: Animalia
- Phylum: Arthropoda
- Class: Insecta
- Order: Coleoptera
- Suborder: Adephaga
- Family: Carabidae
- Subfamily: Psydrinae
- Tribe: Moriomorphini
- Subtribe: Amblytelina
- Genus: Epelyx; Blackburn, 1892

Genus of beetles

Epelyx is a genus in the ground beetle family Carabidae. There are five described species in Epelyx, found in Australia.

== Species ==
These five species belong to the genus Epelyx:

- Epelyx cordatus Baehr, 2004
- Epelyx latus Blackburn, 1892
- Epelyx lincolnensis Baehr, 2004
- Epelyx lindensis Blackburn, 1892
- Epelyx walkeri Baehr, 2004
