= Theprisa =

Scientific classification
- Domain: Eukaryota
- Kingdom: Animalia
- Phylum: Arthropoda
- Class: Insecta
- Order: Coleoptera
- Suborder: Adephaga
- Family: Carabidae
- Subfamily: Psydrinae
- Tribe: Moriomorphini
- Subtribe: Moriomorphina
- Genus: Theprisa; B.Moore, 1963

Genus of beetles

Theprisa is a genus of in the beetle family Carabidae. There are about five described species in Theprisa, all found in Australia.

== Species ==
These five species belong to the genus Theprisa:

- Theprisa australis (Laporte, 1867)
- Theprisa convexa (Sloane, 1920)
- Theprisa darlingtoni Liebherr & Porch, 2021
- Theprisa montana (Laporte, 1867)
- Theprisa otwayi Liebherr; Porch & Maddison, 2021
