= Sitaphe =

Scientific classification
- Domain: Eukaryota
- Kingdom: Animalia
- Phylum: Arthropoda
- Class: Insecta
- Order: Coleoptera
- Suborder: Adephaga
- Family: Carabidae
- Subfamily: Psydrinae
- Tribe: Moriomorphini
- Subtribe: Moriomorphina
- Genus: Sitaphe; B.Moore, 1963

Genus of beetles

Sitaphe is a genus in the ground beetle family Carabidae. There are about eight described species in Sitaphe, found in Australia.

== Species ==
These eight species belong to the genus Sitaphe:

- Sitaphe hamifera Baehr, 2003
- Sitaphe incurvicollis Baehr, 2003
- Sitaphe minuta Baehr, 2003
- Sitaphe ovipennis Baehr, 2003
- Sitaphe parallelipennis Baehr, 2003
- Sitaphe parvicollis Baehr, 2003
- Sitaphe rotundata B.Moore, 1963
- Sitaphe trapezicollis Baehr, 2003
