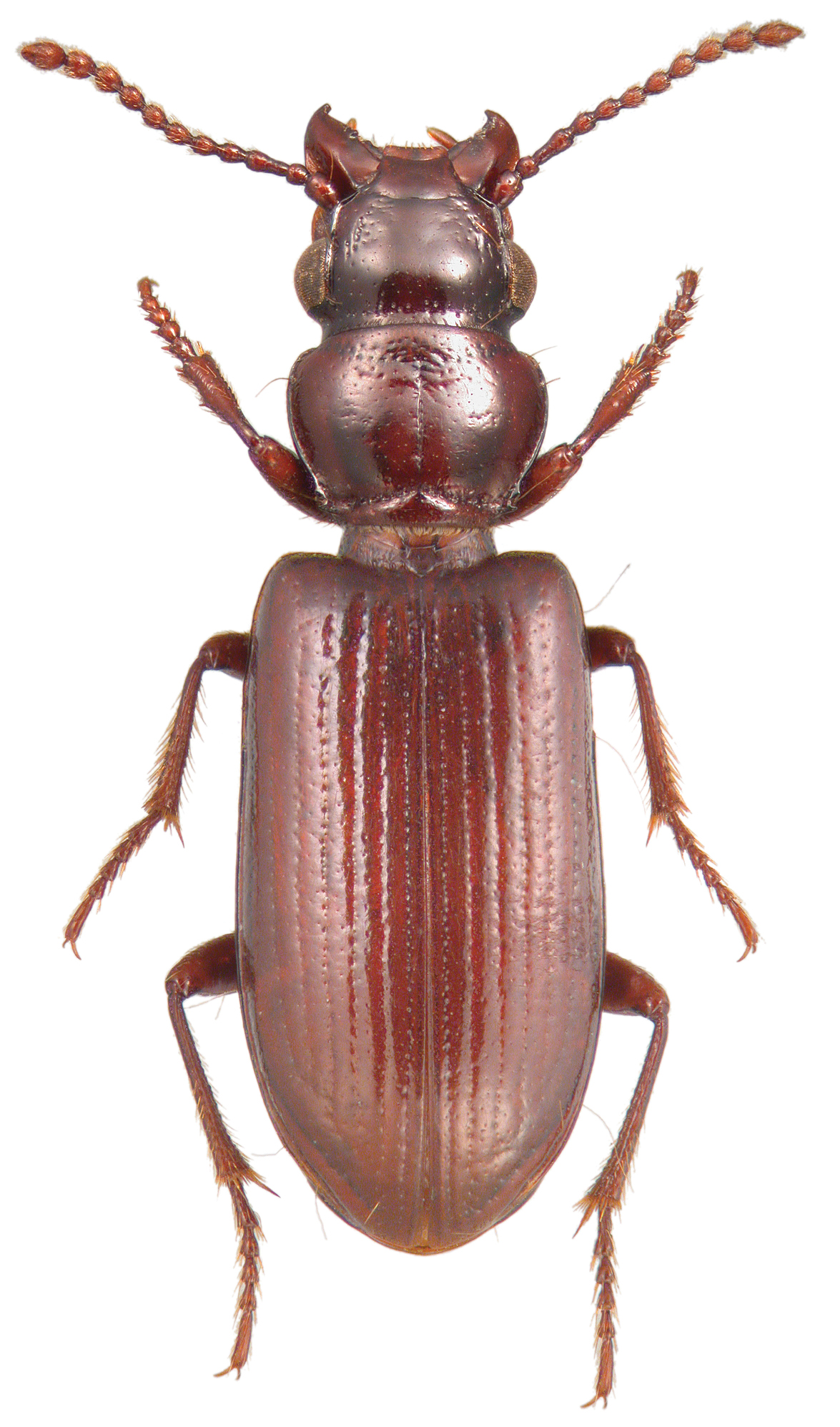

Scientific classification
- Kingdom: Animalia
- Phylum: Arthropoda
- Class: Insecta
- Order: Coleoptera
- Suborder: Adephaga
- Family: Carabidae
- Genus: Nomius
- Species: N. pygmaeus

Binomial name
- Nomius pygmaeus (Dejean, 1831)

= Nomius pygmaeus =

Species of beetle

Nomius pygmaeus, known generally as the stink beetle or stinking beetle, is a species of ground beetle in the family Carabidae. It is found in North America, Europe, Africa, and temperate Asia.
