= Moriodema =

Scientific classification
- Domain: Eukaryota
- Kingdom: Animalia
- Phylum: Arthropoda
- Class: Insecta
- Order: Coleoptera
- Suborder: Adephaga
- Family: Carabidae
- Subfamily: Psydrinae
- Tribe: Moriomorphini
- Subtribe: Moriomorphina
- Genus: Moriodema; Laporte, 1867

Genus of beetles

Moriodema is a genus in the beetle family Carabidae. There are at least two described species in Moriodema, found in Australia.

== Species ==
These two species belong to the genus Moriodema:

- Moriodema mcoyei Laporte, 1867 (Australia)
- Moriodema regalis Baehr, 2011 (Australia)
