= Rhaebolestes =

Scientific classification
- Kingdom: Animalia
- Phylum: Arthropoda
- Class: Insecta
- Order: Coleoptera
- Suborder: Adephaga
- Family: Carabidae
- Subfamily: Psydrinae
- Tribe: Moriomorphini
- Subtribe: Moriomorphina
- Genus: Rhaebolestes; Sloane, 1903

Genus of beetles

Rhaebolestes is a genus in the beetle family Carabidae. There are at least two described species in Rhaebolestes, found in Australia.

== Species ==
These two species belong to the genus Rhaebolestes:

- Rhaebolestes lamingtonensis Baehr, 2011 (Australia)
- Rhaebolestes walkeri Sloane, 1903 (Australia)
