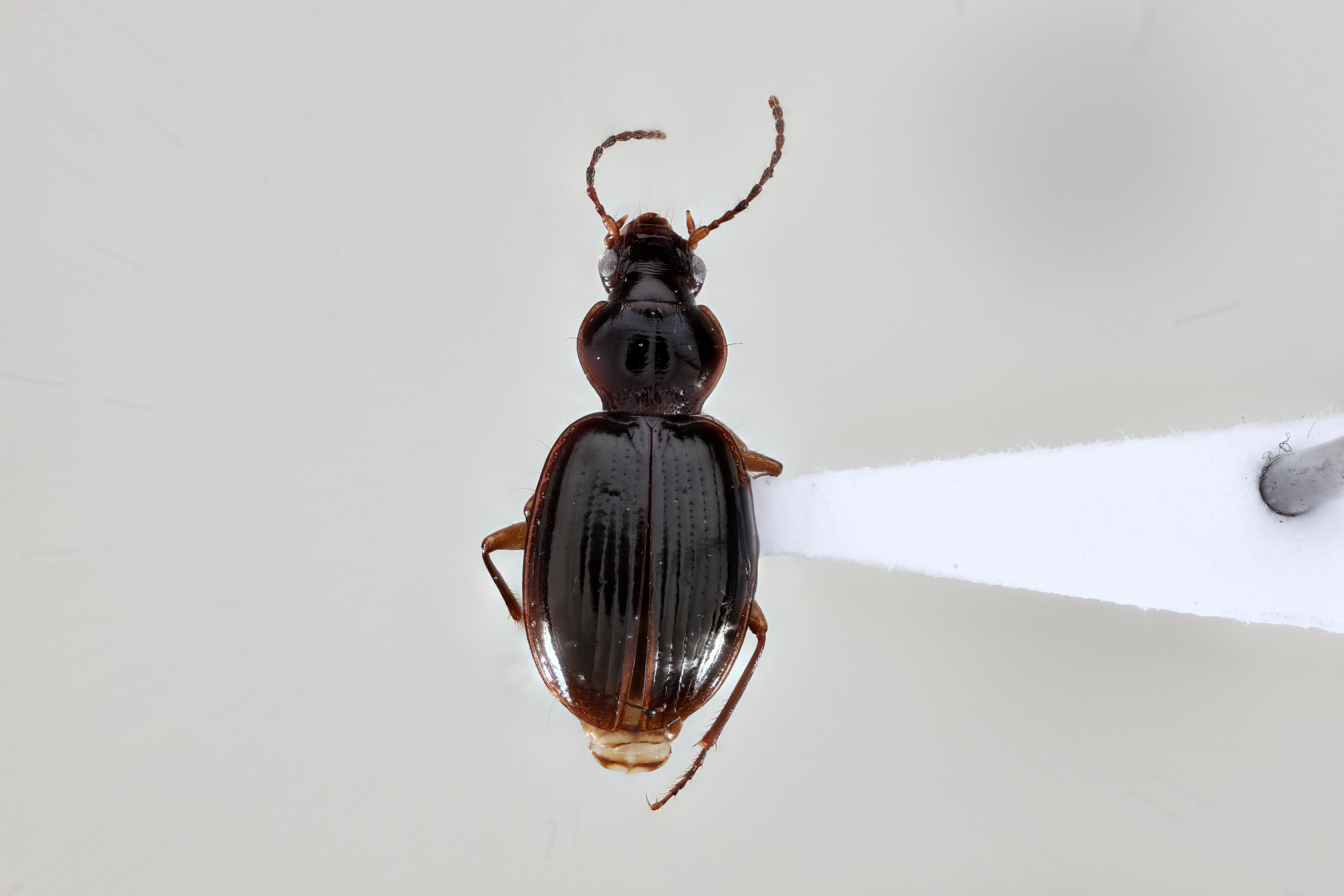
- ' Mecyclothorax konanus imaged at Bernice Pauahi Bishop Museum. Image used courtesy of the National Ecological Observatory Network'

Scientific classification
- Kingdom: Animalia
- Phylum: Arthropoda
- Class: Insecta
- Order: Coleoptera
- Suborder: Adephaga
- Family: Carabidae
- Genus: Mecyclothorax
- Species: M. konanus

Binomial name
- Mecyclothorax konanus Sharp, 1903

Synonyms
- Mecyclothorax gracilis (Sharp 1903); Mecyclothorax proximus Britton 1948

= Mecyclothorax konanus =

Species of beetle

Mecyclothorax konanus is a species of ground beetle in the subfamily Psydrinae. It was described by Sharp in 1903.
