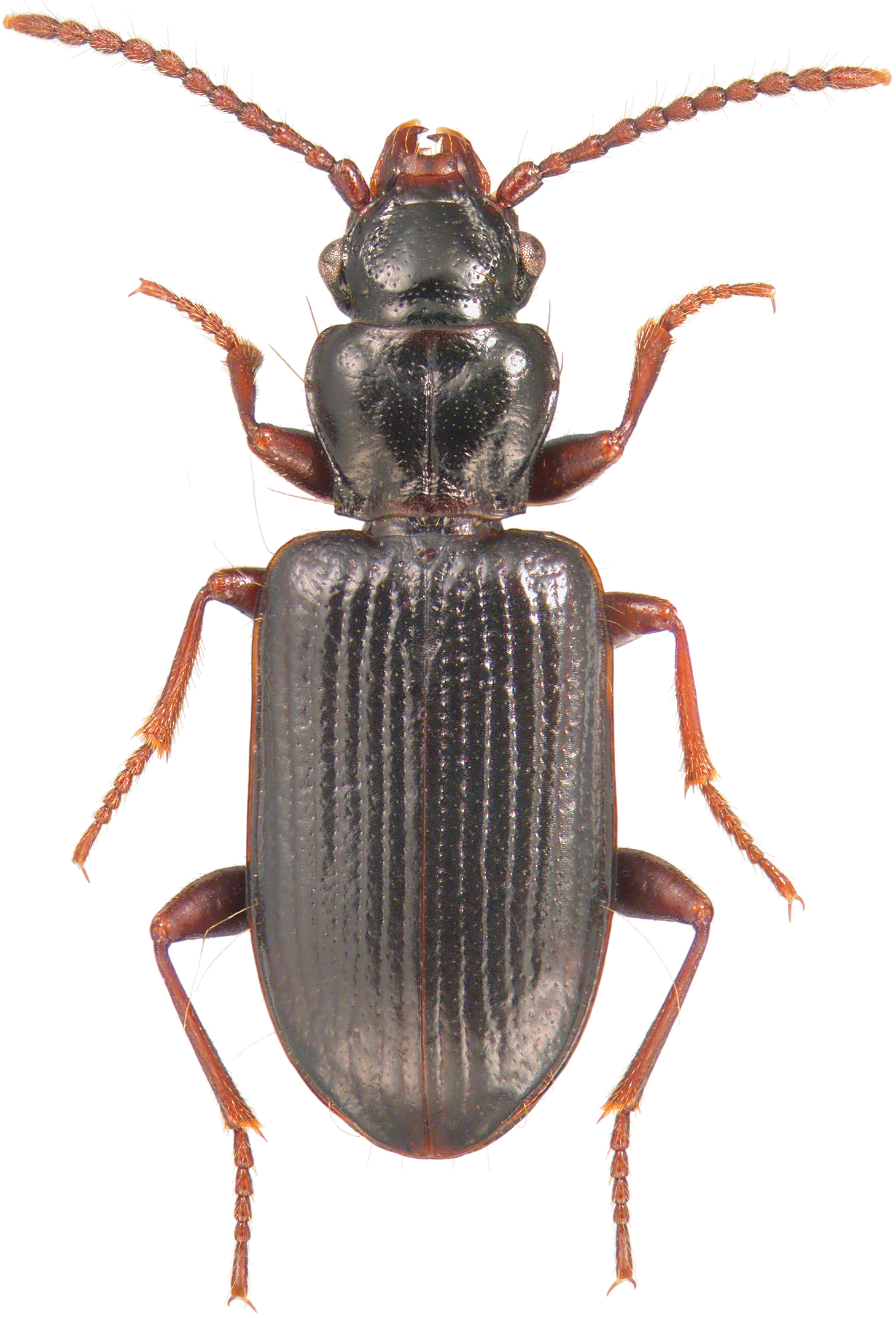

Scientific classification
- Kingdom: Animalia
- Phylum: Arthropoda
- Class: Insecta
- Order: Coleoptera
- Suborder: Adephaga
- Family: Carabidae
- Subfamily: Psydrinae
- Tribe: Psydrini
- Genus: Psydrus; LeConte, 1846
- Species: P. piceus

Binomial name
- Psydrus piceus LeConte, 1846

Synonyms
- Monillipatrobus Hatch, 1933

= Psydrus =

Genus of beetles

Psydrus is a genus in the ground beetle family Carabidae. This genus has a single species, Psydrus piceus. It is found in the United States and Canada.

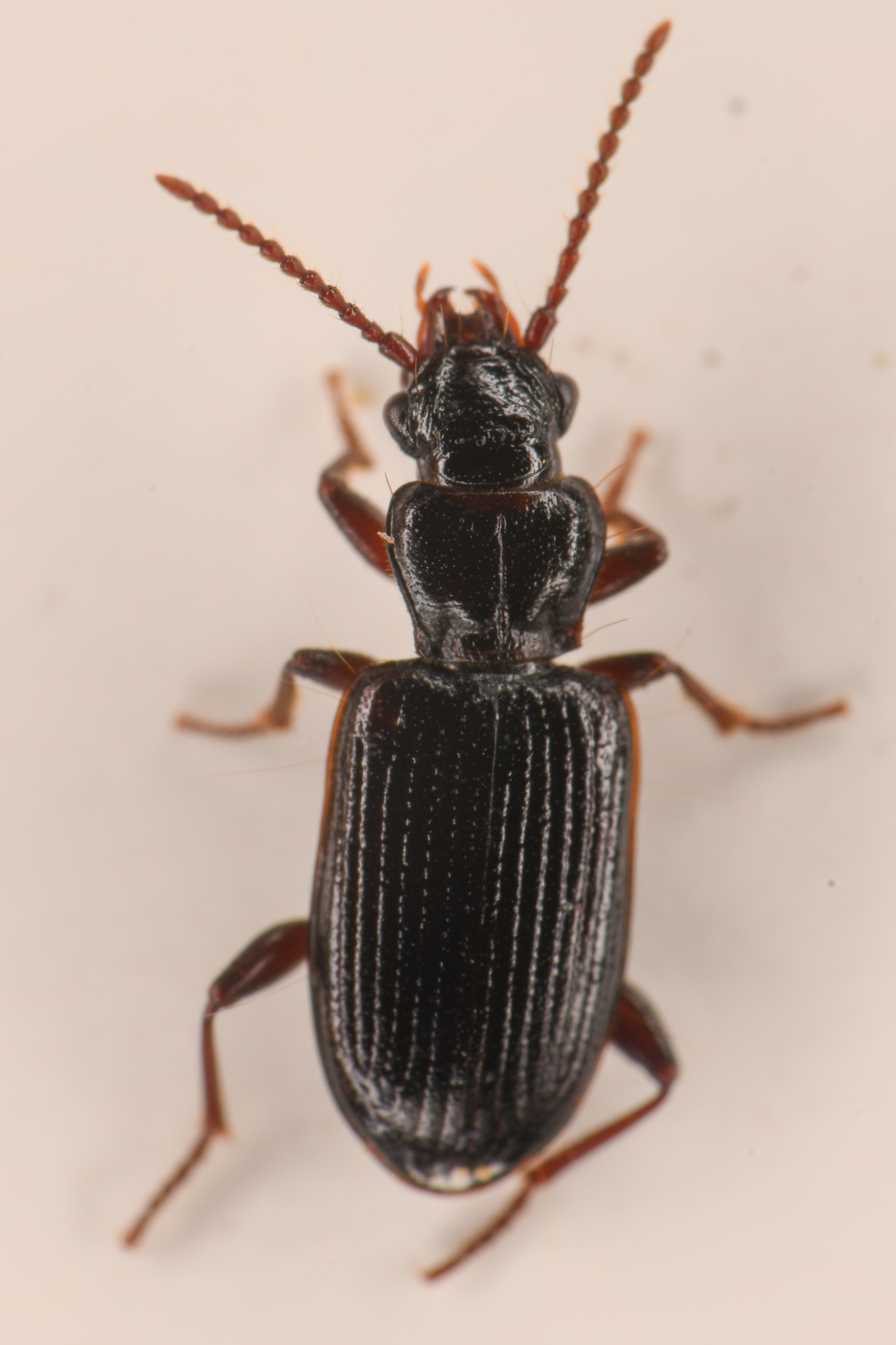
Psydrus piceus, Canada
