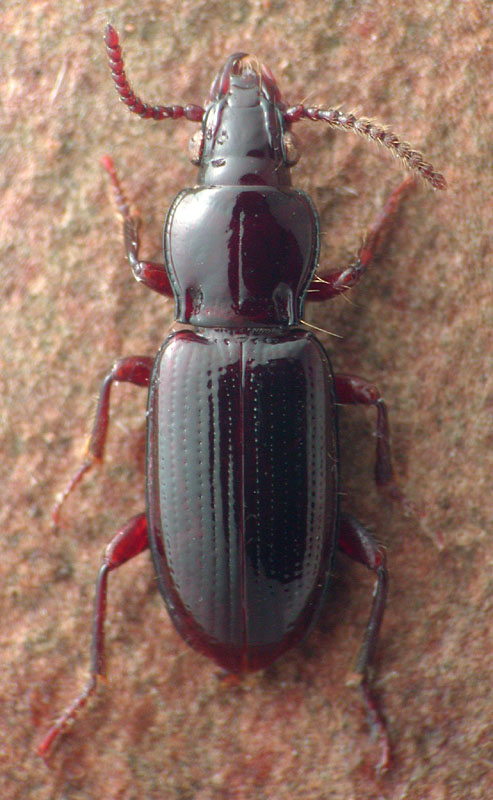
- Laccocenus ambiguus

Scientific classification
- Kingdom: Animalia
- Phylum: Arthropoda
- Class: Insecta
- Order: Coleoptera
- Suborder: Adephaga
- Family: Carabidae
- Subfamily: Psydrinae
- Tribe: Psydrini
- Genus: Laccocenus; Sloane, 1890

= Laccocenus =

Genus of beetles

Laccocenus is a genus in the ground beetle family Carabidae. There are two described species in Laccocenus, both found in Eastern Australia.

== Species ==
These two species belong to the genus Laccocenus:

- Laccocenus ambiguus Sloane, 1890 – Australia (New South Wales), (Queensland)
- Laccocenus vicinus B.Moore, 2004 – Australia (New South Wales)

Laccocenus ambiguus has a relatively widespread distribution across coastal eastern Australia, after being first described from Dunoon, in the northern extremity of New South Wales. In contrast, Laccocenus vicinus is known only from Deua Cave (in Deua National Park, New South Wales).
