= Tropopterus =

Scientific classification
- Domain: Eukaryota
- Kingdom: Animalia
- Phylum: Arthropoda
- Class: Insecta
- Order: Coleoptera
- Suborder: Adephaga
- Family: Carabidae
- Subfamily: Psydrinae
- Tribe: Moriomorphini
- Subtribe: Tropopterina
- Genus: Tropopterus; Solier, 1849

Genus of beetles

Tropopterus is a genus in the beetle family Carabidae. There are about 10 described species in Tropopterus, found in South America.

== Species ==
These 10 species belong to the genus Tropopterus:

- Tropopterus canaliculus Liebherr, 2019 (Chile)
- Tropopterus duponchelii Solier, 1849 (Chile)
- Tropopterus fieldianus Liebherr, 2019 (Chile)
- Tropopterus giraudyi Solier, 1849 (Chile and Argentina)
- Tropopterus minimucro Liebherr, 2019 (Chile)
- Tropopterus montagnei Solier, 1849 (Chile)
- Tropopterus peckorum Liebherr, 2019 (Chile)
- Tropopterus peruvianus Straneo, 1954 (Peru)
- Tropopterus robustus Liebherr, 2019 (Chile)
- Tropopterus trisinuatus Liebherr, 2019 (Chile)
