= Raphetis =

Scientific classification
- Domain: Eukaryota
- Kingdom: Animalia
- Phylum: Arthropoda
- Class: Insecta
- Order: Coleoptera
- Suborder: Adephaga
- Family: Carabidae
- Subfamily: Psydrinae
- Tribe: Moriomorphini
- Subtribe: Amblytelina
- Genus: Raphetis; B.Moore, 1963

Genus of beetles

Raphetis is a genus in the ground beetle family Carabidae. There are at least three described species in Raphetis, found in Australia.

== Species ==
These three species belong to the genus Raphetis:

- Raphetis curta Baehr, 2003
- Raphetis darlingtoni B.Moore, 1963
- Raphetis gracilis B.Moore, 1963
