= Meonis =

Scientific classification
- Domain: Eukaryota
- Kingdom: Animalia
- Phylum: Arthropoda
- Class: Insecta
- Order: Coleoptera
- Suborder: Adephaga
- Family: Carabidae
- Subfamily: Psydrinae
- Tribe: Moriomorphini
- Subtribe: Amblytelina
- Genus: Meonis; Laporte, 1867

Subgenera
- Meonidius Baehr, 2007; Meonis Laporte, 1867

Genus of beetles

Meonis is a genus in the beetle family Carabidae. There are about 16 described species in Meonis, found in Australia.

== Species ==
These 16 species belong to the genus Meonis:

- Meonis amplicollis Sloane, 1915
- Meonis angusticollis Sloane, 1911
- Meonis angustior Baehr, 2007
- Meonis ater Castelnau, 1867
- Meonis carteri Baehr, 2007
- Meonis convexus Sloane, 1900
- Meonis cordicollis Baehr, 2007
- Meonis interruptus Baehr, 2007
- Meonis magnus Baehr, 2007
- Meonis minor Sloane, 1916
- Meonis niger Castelnau, 1867
- Meonis quinquesulcatus Baehr, 2007
- Meonis semistriatus Sloane, 1916
- Meonis styx Baehr, 2007
- Meonis subconvexus Baehr, 2007
- Meonis uncinatus Baehr, 2007
