= Dystrichothorax =

Scientific classification
- Domain: Eukaryota
- Kingdom: Animalia
- Phylum: Arthropoda
- Class: Insecta
- Order: Coleoptera
- Suborder: Adephaga
- Family: Carabidae
- Subfamily: Psydrinae
- Genus: Dystrichothorax; Blackburn, 1892

Genus of beetles

Dystrichothorax is a genus in the beetle family Carabidae. There are more than 50 described species in Dystrichothorax, found in Australia.

== Species ==
These 52 species belong to the genus Dystrichothorax:

- Dystrichothorax amplipennis (W.J.MacLeay, 1871)
- Dystrichothorax angustimargo Baehr, 2004
- Dystrichothorax australis (Erichson, 1842)
- Dystrichothorax bernhardti Baehr, 2004
- Dystrichothorax bicolor Blackburn, 1892
- Dystrichothorax bipunctatus Blackburn, 1892
- Dystrichothorax capitis Baehr, 2016
- Dystrichothorax catrionae Baehr, 2004
- Dystrichothorax convexicollis Baehr, 2004
- Dystrichothorax convexior Baehr, 2004
- Dystrichothorax corrugatus Baehr, 2004
- Dystrichothorax demarzi Baehr, 2004
- Dystrichothorax difficilis Baehr, 2004
- Dystrichothorax dilatatus (Erichson, 1842)
- Dystrichothorax eungellae Baehr, 2004
- Dystrichothorax gibbosus Baehr, 2004
- Dystrichothorax hamifer Baehr, 2004
- Dystrichothorax hawkeswoodi Baehr, 2004
- Dystrichothorax heatherae Baehr, 2004
- Dystrichothorax laevior Baehr, 2004
- Dystrichothorax laevipennis Baehr, 2004
- Dystrichothorax lamingtonensis Baehr, 2004
- Dystrichothorax leichardtensis Baehr, 2006
- Dystrichothorax lewisensis Baehr, 2004
- Dystrichothorax lividus Blackburn, 1892
- Dystrichothorax macrops Baehr, 2004
- Dystrichothorax montiscoerulei Baehr, 2006
- Dystrichothorax moorei Baehr, 2004
- Dystrichothorax multistriatus Baehr, 2004
- Dystrichothorax nothofagi Baehr, 2004
- Dystrichothorax novaeangliae Baehr, 2004
- Dystrichothorax odegaardi Baehr, 2008
- Dystrichothorax otwayensis Baehr, 2004
- Dystrichothorax parallelocollis Baehr, 2004
- Dystrichothorax piceus Baehr, 2004
- Dystrichothorax pictus Baehr, 2004
- Dystrichothorax placidus Lea, 1908
- Dystrichothorax plagifer Baehr, 2004
- Dystrichothorax regularis Baehr, 2004
- Dystrichothorax reidi Baehr, 2004
- Dystrichothorax rufinus Baehr, 2016
- Dystrichothorax similis Baehr, 2008
- Dystrichothorax sloanei Blackburn, 1892
- Dystrichothorax storeyi Baehr, 2004
- Dystrichothorax tasmaniensis Baehr, 2004
- Dystrichothorax trisetosus Baehr, 2016
- Dystrichothorax verticis Baehr, 2004
- Dystrichothorax vicinus Blackburn, 1892
- Dystrichothorax victoriae Baehr, 2004
- Dystrichothorax vittipennis (Sloane, 1911)
- Dystrichothorax windsorensis Baehr, 2004
- Dystrichothorax wrightae Baehr, 2016
