= Melisodera =

Scientific classification
- Kingdom: Animalia
- Phylum: Arthropoda
- Class: Insecta
- Order: Coleoptera
- Suborder: Adephaga
- Family: Carabidae
- Subfamily: Psydrinae
- Tribe: Moriomorphini
- Subtribe: Moriomorphina
- Genus: Melisodera; Westwood, 1835

Genus of beetles

Melisodera is a genus in the beetle family Carabidae. There are at least two described species in Melisodera.

== Species ==
These two species belong to the genus Melisodera:

- Melisodera gigas Baehr, 2011 (Australia)
- Melisodera piceipennis Westwood, 1835 (Australia)
