= Teraphis =

Scientific classification
- Domain: Eukaryota
- Kingdom: Animalia
- Phylum: Arthropoda
- Class: Insecta
- Order: Coleoptera
- Suborder: Adephaga
- Family: Carabidae
- Subfamily: Psydrinae
- Tribe: Moriomorphini
- Subtribe: Moriomorphina
- Genus: Teraphis; Castelnau, 1867

Genus of beetles

Teraphis is a genus of beetles in the family Carabidae, containing the following species:

- Teraphis cavicola Moore, 1977
- Teraphis crenulata (Sloane, 1923)
- Teraphis elongata Castelnau, 1867
- Teraphis helmsi (Sloane, 1890)
- Teraphis melbournensis Castelnau, 1867
- Teraphis tasmanica (Sloane, 1920)
