= Trichamblytelus =

Trichamblytelus ovalipennis

Scientific classification
- Kingdom: Animalia
- Phylum: Arthropoda
- Class: Insecta
- Order: Coleoptera
- Suborder: Adephaga
- Family: Carabidae
- Subfamily: Harpalinae
- Genus: Trichamblytelus; Baehr, 2004
- Species: T. ovalipennis

Binomial name
- Trichamblytelus ovalipennis Baehr, 2004

Genus of beetles

Trichamblytelus ovalipennis is a species of beetle in the family Carabidae, the only species in the genus Trichamblytelus.
