= Pterogmus =

Scientific classification
- Kingdom: Animalia
- Phylum: Arthropoda
- Class: Insecta
- Order: Coleoptera
- Suborder: Adephaga
- Family: Carabidae
- Tribe: Moriomorphini
- Subtribe: Moriomorphina
- Genus: Pterogmus; Sloane, 1920
- Species: P. rufipes

Binomial name
- Pterogmus rufipes Sloane, 1920

Genus of beetles

Pterogmus is a genus in the ground beetle family Carabidae. This genus has a single species, Pterogmus rufipes. It is found in Australia.
