= Pseudamblytelus =

Scientific classification
- Domain: Eukaryota
- Kingdom: Animalia
- Phylum: Arthropoda
- Class: Insecta
- Order: Coleoptera
- Suborder: Adephaga
- Family: Carabidae
- Tribe: Moriomorphini
- Subtribe: Amblytelina
- Genus: Pseudamblytelus; Baehr, 2004
- Species: P. orbicollis

Binomial name
- Pseudamblytelus orbicollis Baehr, 2004

Genus of beetles

Pseudamblytelus is a genus in the ground beetle family Carabidae. This genus has a single species, Pseudamblytelus orbicollis.
