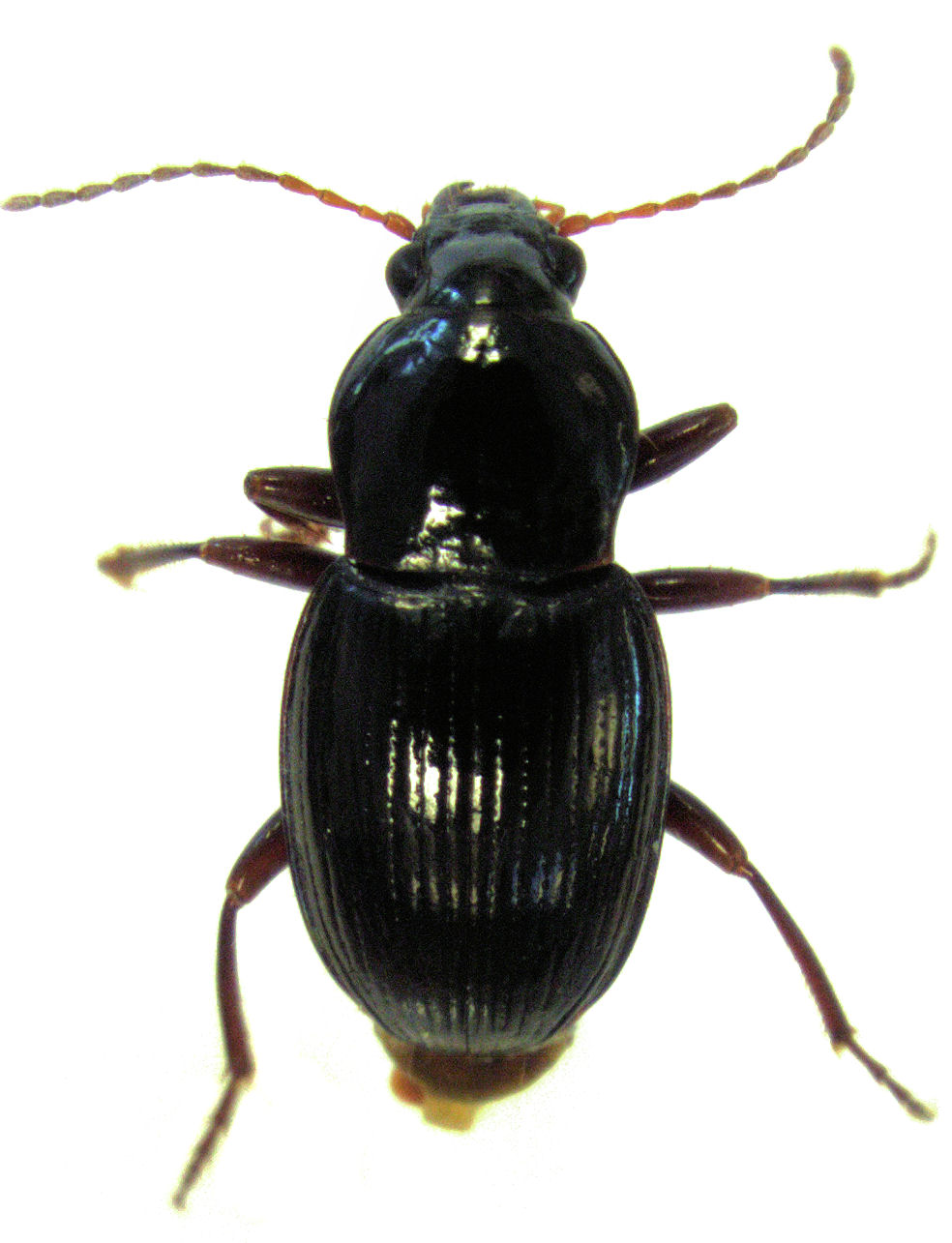
- Molopsida polita (male)

Scientific classification
- Domain: Eukaryota
- Kingdom: Animalia
- Phylum: Arthropoda
- Class: Insecta
- Order: Coleoptera
- Suborder: Adephaga
- Family: Carabidae
- Tribe: Moriomorphini
- Subtribe: Moriomorphina
- Genus: Molopsida; White, 1846

= Molopsida =

Genus of beetles

Molopsida is a genus of beetles in the family Carabidae, endemic to New Zealand. This genus was first described by Adam White (zoologist) in 1846. Molopsida includes the following six species:

- Molopsida antarctica (Castelnau, 1867)
- Molopsida cordipennis (Broun, 1912)
- Molopsida lindrothi Larochelle & Larivière, 2013
- Molopsida polita White, 1846
- Molopsida seriatoporus (Bates, 1874)
- Molopsida strenua (Broun, 1894)
