= Trephisa =

Scientific classification
- Domain: Eukaryota
- Kingdom: Animalia
- Phylum: Arthropoda
- Class: Insecta
- Order: Coleoptera
- Suborder: Adephaga
- Family: Carabidae
- Tribe: Moriomorphini
- Subtribe: Moriomorphina
- Genus: Trephisa; Moore, 1963
- Species: T. parallela

Binomial name
- Trephisa parallela Moore, 1963

Genus of beetles

Trephisa parallela is a species of beetle in the family Carabidae, the only species in the genus Trephisa.
