= Paratrichothorax =

Scientific classification
- Domain: Eukaryota
- Kingdom: Animalia
- Phylum: Arthropoda
- Class: Insecta
- Order: Coleoptera
- Suborder: Adephaga
- Family: Carabidae
- Tribe: Moriomorphini
- Subtribe: Amblytelina
- Genus: Paratrichothorax; Baehr, 2004
- Species: P. brevistylis

Binomial name
- Paratrichothorax brevistylis Baehr, 2004

Genus of beetles

Paratrichothorax is a genus in the ground beetle family Carabidae. This genus has a single species, Paratrichothorax brevistylis.
