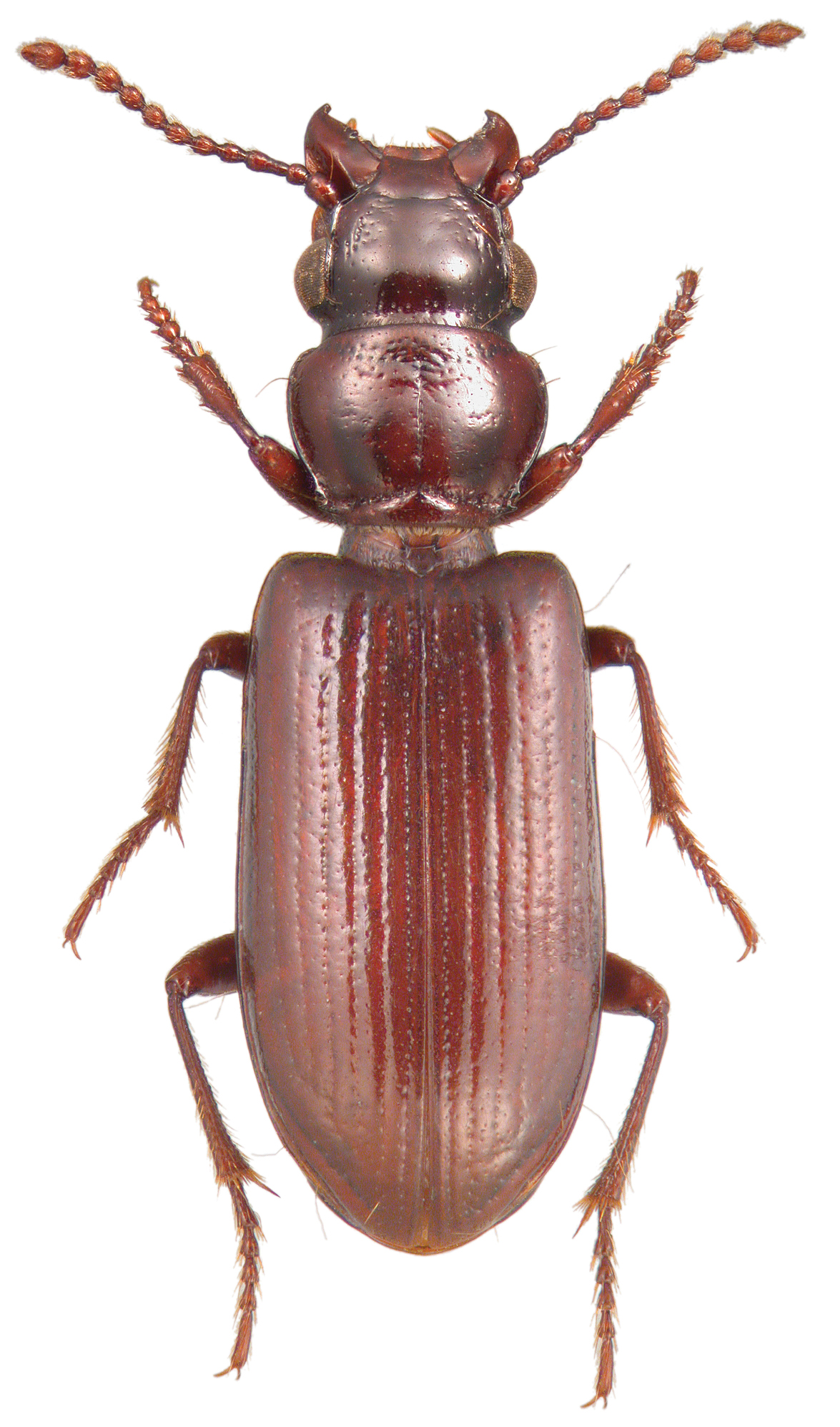
- Nomius pygmaeus, stink beetle

Scientific classification
- Kingdom: Animalia
- Phylum: Arthropoda
- Clade: Pancrustacea
- Class: Insecta
- Order: Coleoptera
- Suborder: Adephaga
- Family: Carabidae
- Subfamily: Psydrinae
- Tribe: Psydrini
- Genus: Nomius; Laporte, 1835

Synonyms
- Aplochile LeConte, 1846; Haplochile LeConte, 1850

= Nomius (beetle) =

Genus of beetles

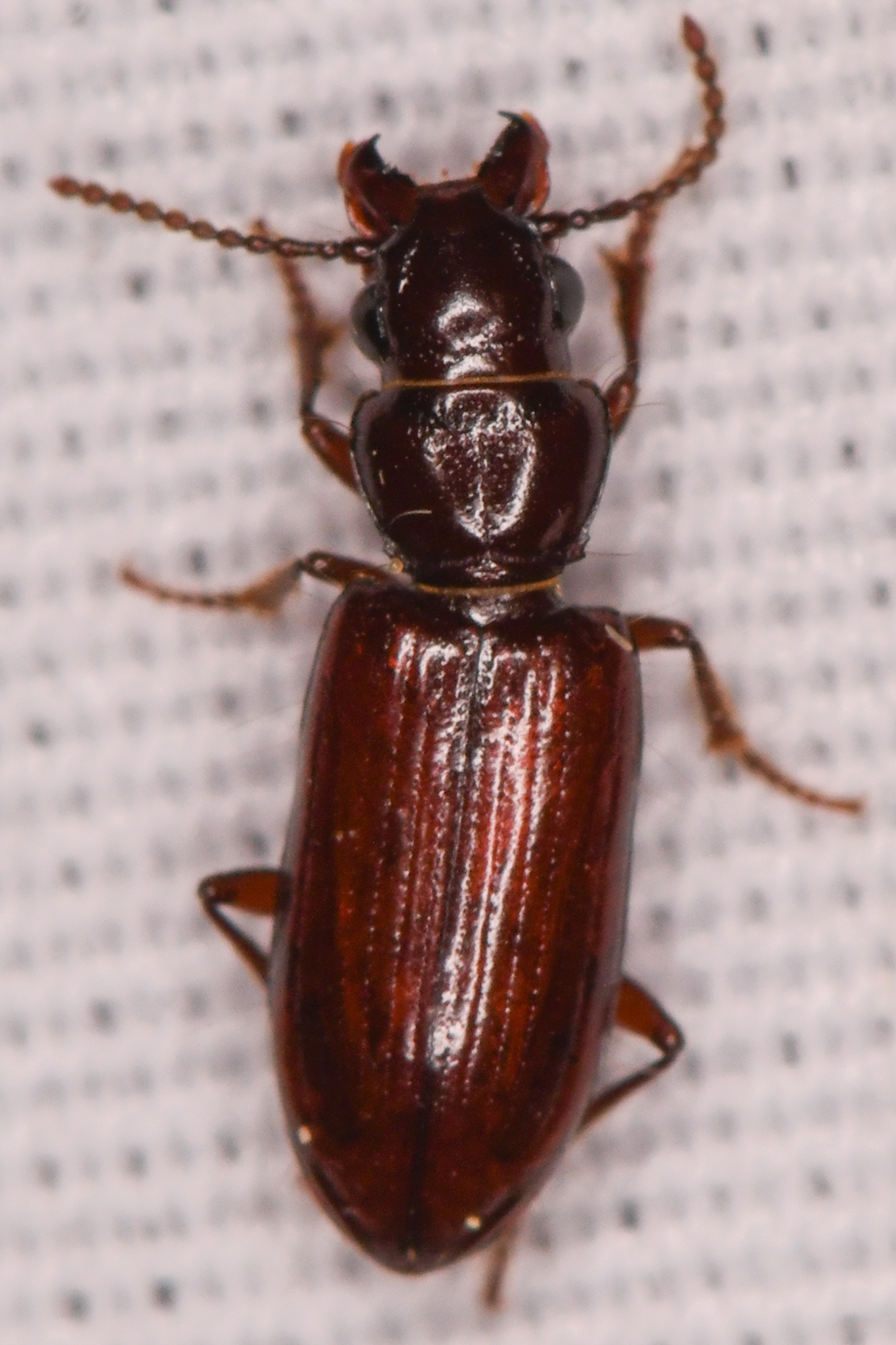
Nomius pygmaeus, California

Nomius is a genus of ground beetles in the family Carabidae. There are at least three described species in Nomius.

== Species ==
These three species belong to the genus Nomius:

- Nomius madagascariensis Basilewsky, 1967 (Madagascar)
- Nomius pygmaeus (Dejean, 1831) (North America, Europe, North Africa, temperate Asia)
- Nomius schoutedeni Basilewsky, 1954 (Africa)
