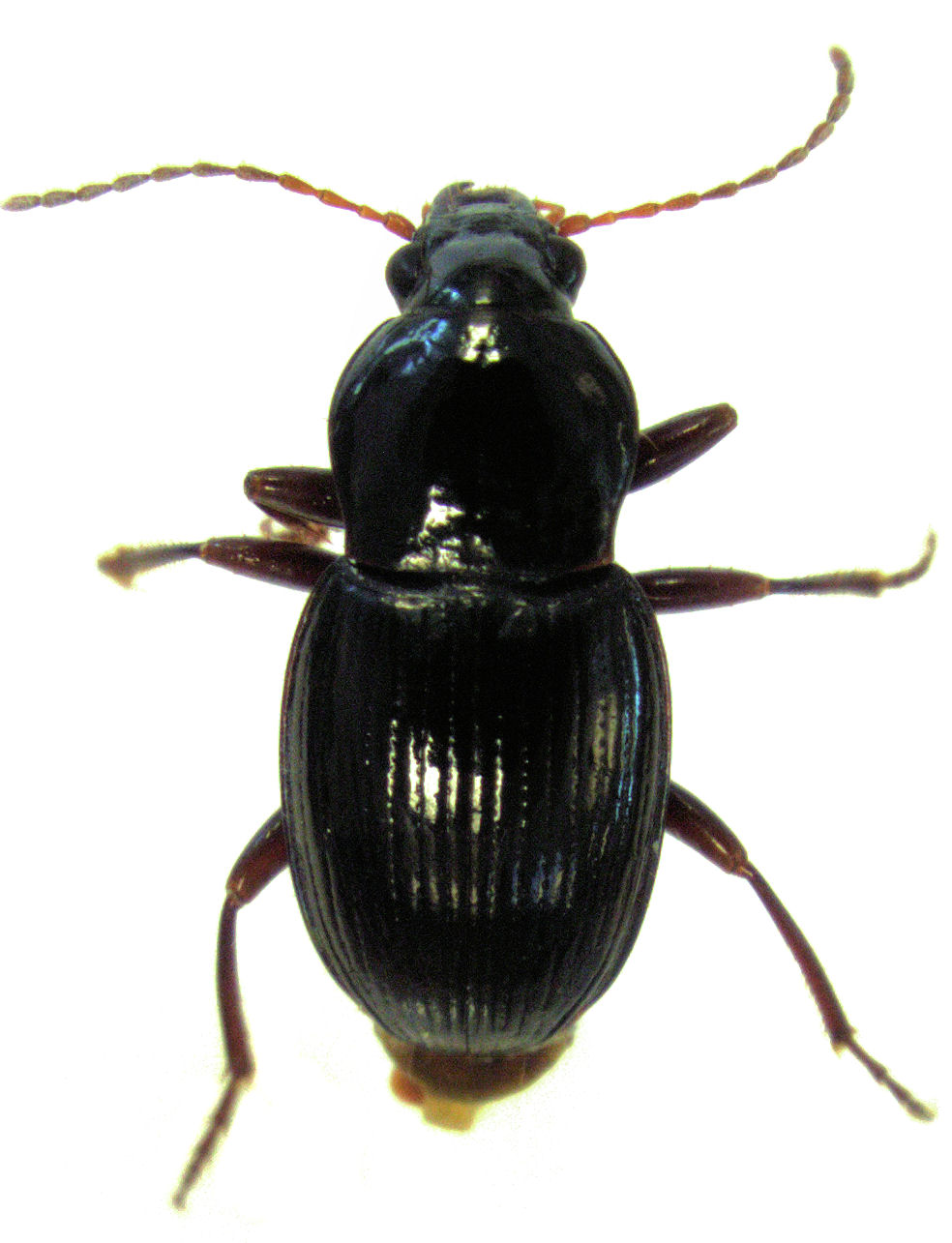
- An adult male Molopsida polita, length about 6.5 mm

Scientific classification
- Domain: Eukaryota
- Kingdom: Animalia
- Phylum: Arthropoda
- Class: Insecta
- Order: Coleoptera
- Suborder: Adephaga
- Family: Carabidae
- Subfamily: Psydrinae; LeConte, 1853

= Psydrinae =

Subfamily of beetles

Psydrinae is a subfamily of beetles in the family Carabidae.

== Genera ==
These 34 genera belong to the subfamily Psydrinae:

Tribe Gehringiini Darlington, 1933

- Afrogehringia Baehr; Schüle & Lorenz, 2009
- Gehringia Darlington, 1933
- Helenaea Schatzmayr & Koch, 1934

Tribe Moriomorphini Sloane, 1890

- Amblytelus Erichson, 1842
- Celanida Laporte, 1867
- Dystrichothorax Blackburn, 1892
- Epelyx Blackburn, 1892
- Mecyclothorax Sharp, 1903
- Melisodera Westwood, 1835
- Meonis Laporte, 1867
- Molopsida White, 1846
- Moriodema Laporte, 1867
- Moriomorpha Laporte, 1867
- Neonomius B.Moore, 1963
- Paratrichothorax Baehr, 2004
- Pharetis Liebherr, 2020
- Pseudamblytelus Baehr, 2004
- Pterogmus Sloane, 1920
- Raphetis B.Moore, 1963
- Rhaebolestes Sloane, 1903
- Rossjoycea Liebherr, 2011
- Selenochilus Chaudoir, 1878
- Sitaphe B.Moore, 1963
- Spherita Liebherr, 2020
- Tarastethus Sharp, 1883
- Teraphis Laporte, 1867
- Theprisa B.Moore, 1963
- Trephisa B.Moore, 1963
- Trichamblytelus Baehr, 2004
- Trichopsida Larochelle & Larivière, 2013
- Tropopterus Solier, 1849

Tribe Psydrini LeConte, 1853

- Laccocenus Sloane, 1890
- Nomius Laporte, 1835
- Psydrus LeConte, 1846
