= Polpochila capitata =

Scientific classification
- Domain: Eukaryota
- Kingdom: Animalia
- Phylum: Arthropoda
- Class: Insecta
- Order: Coleoptera
- Suborder: Adephaga
- Family: Carabidae
- Subfamily: Harpalinae
- Tribe: Harpalini
- Subtribe: Stenolophina
- Genus: Polpochila
- Species: P. capitata

Binomial name
- Polpochila capitata (Chaudoir, 1852)

Species of beetle

Polpochila capitata is a species of ground beetle in the family Carabidae. It is found in North America.
