= Dicheirotrichus mannerheimii =

Scientific classification
- Domain: Eukaryota
- Kingdom: Animalia
- Phylum: Arthropoda
- Class: Insecta
- Order: Coleoptera
- Suborder: Adephaga
- Family: Carabidae
- Subfamily: Harpalinae
- Tribe: Harpalini
- Subtribe: Stenolophina
- Genus: Dicheirotrichus
- Species: D. mannerheimii

Binomial name
- Dicheirotrichus mannerheimii (R. Sahlberg, 1844)

Species of beetle

Dicheirotrichus mannerheimii is a species of ground beetle in the family Carabidae. It is found in Europe and Northern Asia (excluding China) and North America.

== Subspecies ==
These four subspecies belong to the species Dicheirotrichus mannerheimii:

- Dicheirotrichus mannerheimii mannerheimi (R.F.Sahlberg, 1844)
- Dicheirotrichus mannerheimii mannerheimii (R. Sahlberg, 1844)
- Dicheirotrichus mannerheimii oreophilus (K. & J.Daniel, 1890)
- Dicheirotrichus mannerheimii ponojensis (J.Sahlberg, 1875)
