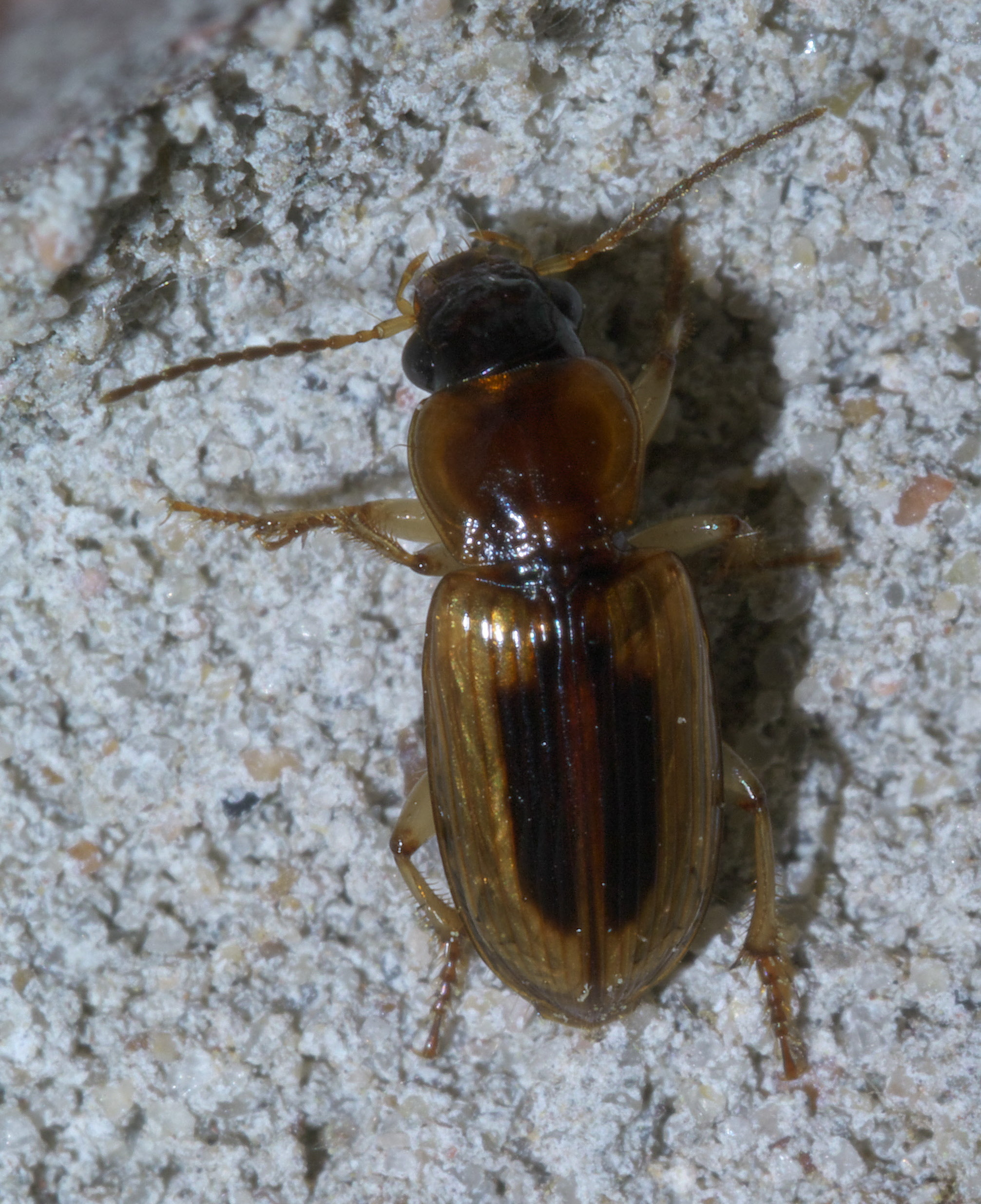

Scientific classification
- Domain: Eukaryota
- Kingdom: Animalia
- Phylum: Arthropoda
- Class: Insecta
- Order: Coleoptera
- Suborder: Adephaga
- Family: Carabidae
- Subfamily: Harpalinae
- Tribe: Harpalini
- Subtribe: Stenolophina
- Genus: Stenolophus
- Species: S. lecontei

Binomial name
- Stenolophus lecontei (Chaudoir, 1868)

Synonyms
- Stenolophus idoneus (Casey, 1914); Stenolophus tarsalis (Casey, 1914); Stenolophus vacans (Casey, 1914); Stenolophus vividus (Casey, 1914)

= Stenolophus lecontei =

Species of beetle

Stenolophus lecontei, or Leconte's seedcorn beetle, is a species of ground beetle in the family Carabidae. It is found in North America.

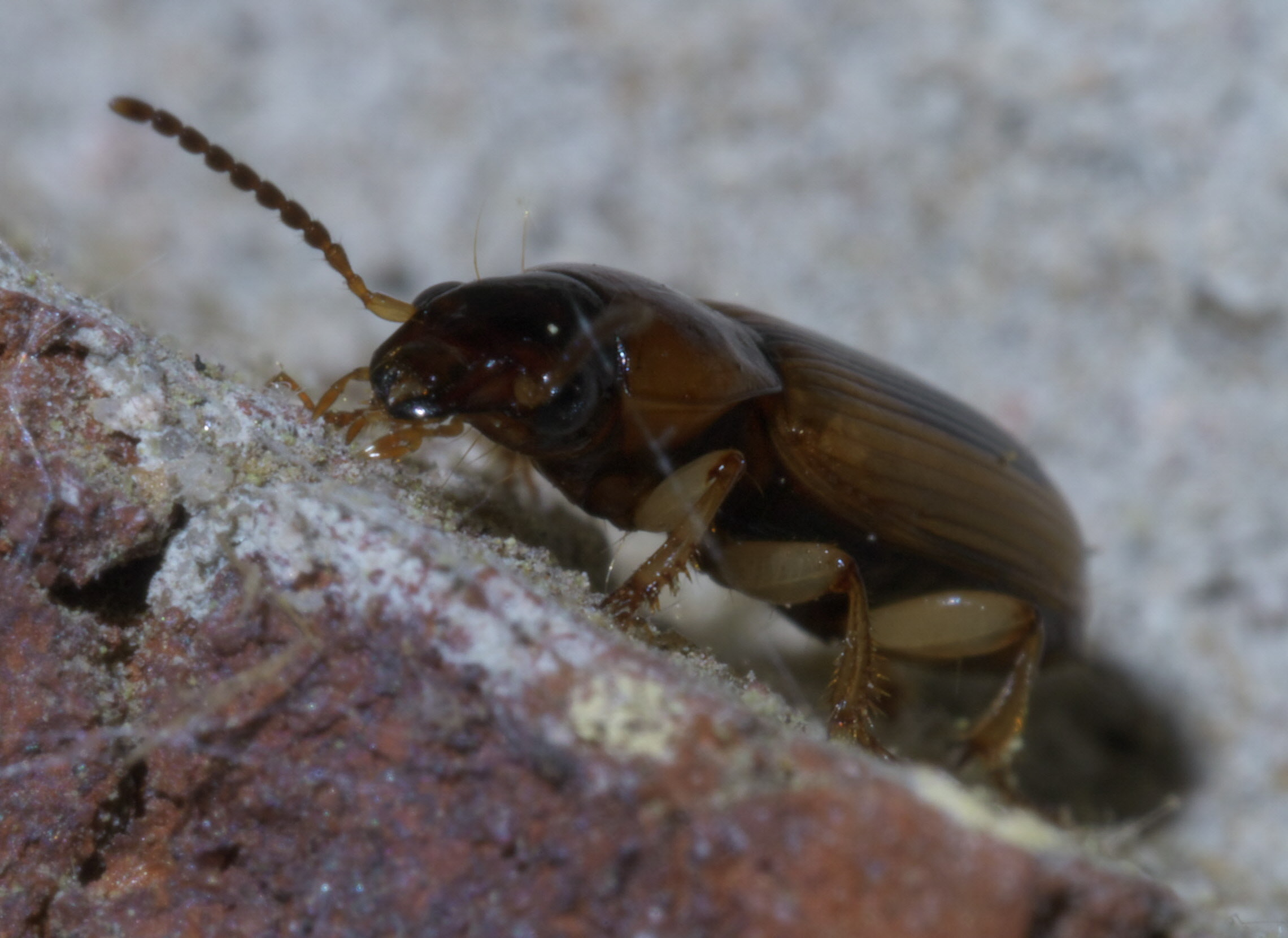
Leconte's seedcorn beetle, Stenolophus lecontei

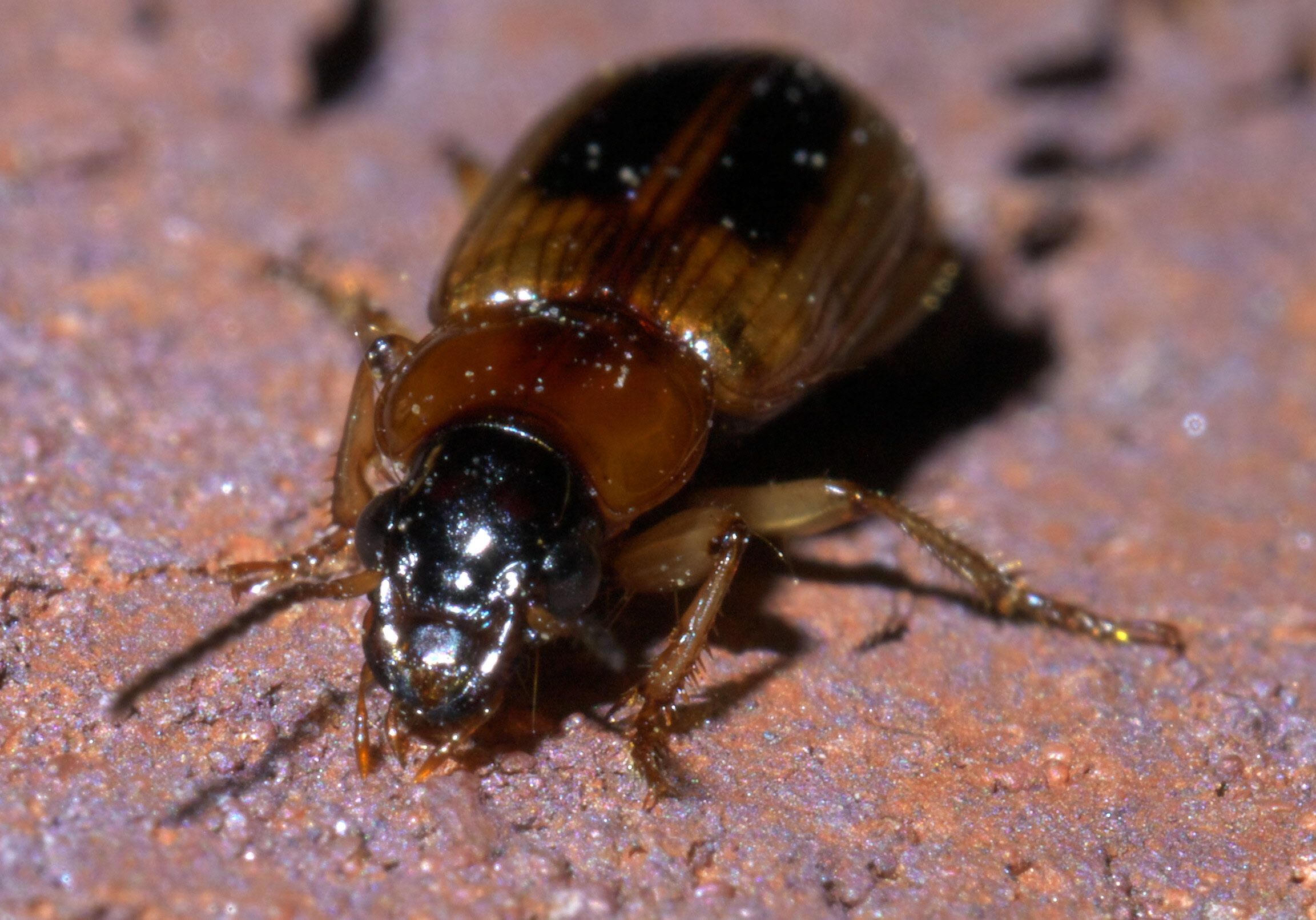
Leconte's seedcorn beetle, Stenolophus lecontei
