= Philodes longulus =

Scientific classification
- Kingdom: Animalia
- Phylum: Arthropoda
- Class: Insecta
- Order: Coleoptera
- Suborder: Adephaga
- Family: Carabidae
- Tribe: Harpalini
- Subtribe: Stenolophina
- Genus: Philodes
- Species: P. longulus

Binomial name
- Philodes longulus (Dejean, 1829)

Synonyms
- Acupalpus longulus Dejean, 1829

Species of beetle

Philodes longulus is a species of ground beetle in the family Carabidae. It is found in the Caribbean Sea and North America.

Its body is bilaterally symmetrical. it has holometabolous mode of development.
