= Stenolophus humidus =

Scientific classification
- Domain: Eukaryota
- Kingdom: Animalia
- Phylum: Arthropoda
- Class: Insecta
- Order: Coleoptera
- Suborder: Adephaga
- Family: Carabidae
- Subfamily: Harpalinae
- Tribe: Harpalini
- Subtribe: Stenolophina
- Genus: Stenolophus
- Species: S. humidus

Binomial name
- Stenolophus humidus Hamilton, 1893

Species of beetle

Stenolophus humidus is a species of ground beetle in the family Carabidae. It is found in North America.
