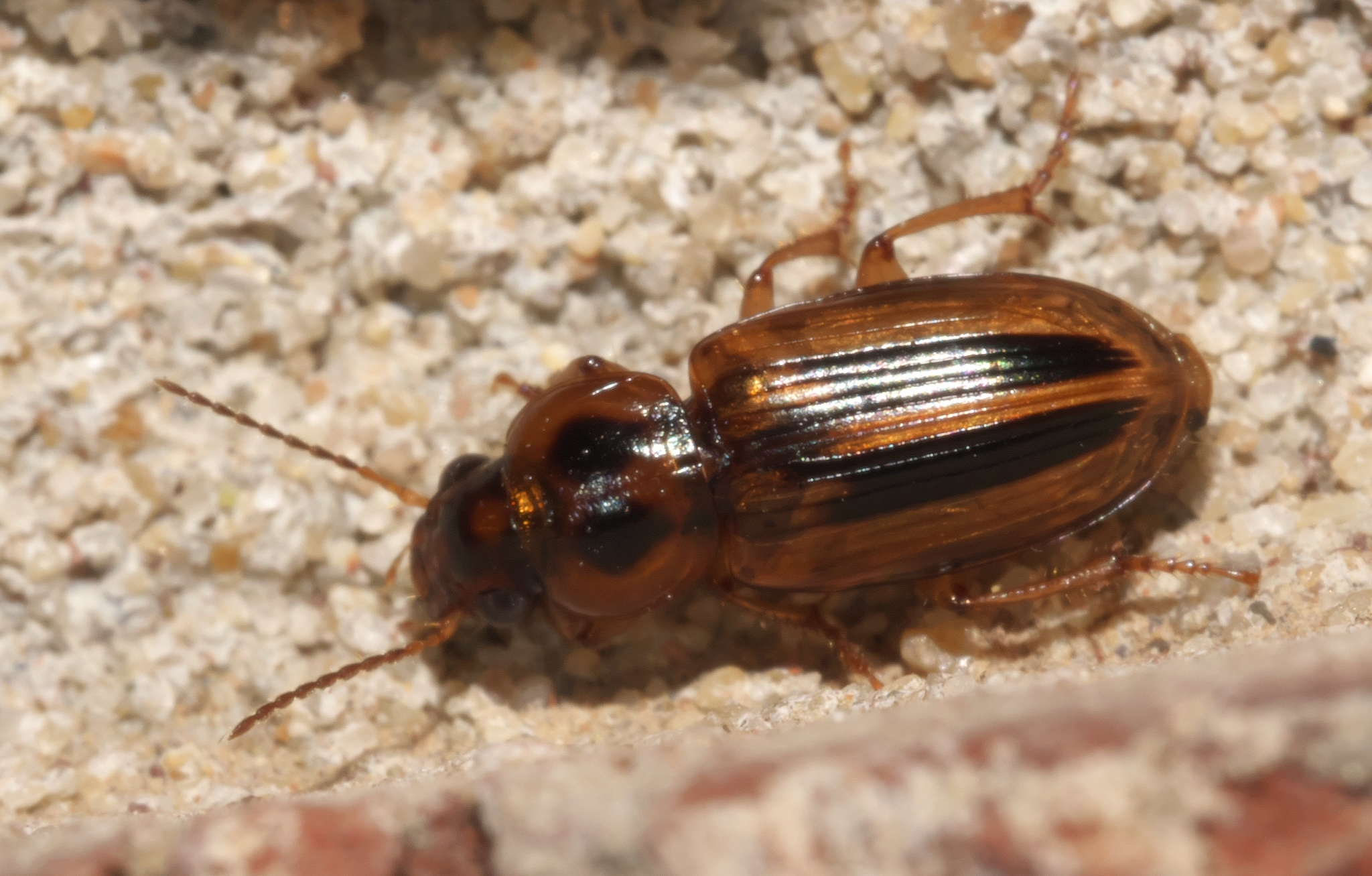
- Stenolophus binotatus, Oklahoma

Scientific classification
- Kingdom: Animalia
- Phylum: Arthropoda
- Class: Insecta
- Order: Coleoptera
- Suborder: Adephaga
- Family: Carabidae
- Tribe: Harpalini
- Subtribe: Stenolophina
- Genus: Stenolophus
- Species: S. binotatus

Binomial name
- Stenolophus binotatus (Casey, 1914)

= Stenolophus binotatus =

Species of beetle

Stenolophus binotatus is a species of ground beetle in the family Carabidae. It is found in North America.
