= Stenolophus spretus =

Scientific classification
- Kingdom: Animalia
- Phylum: Arthropoda
- Class: Insecta
- Order: Coleoptera
- Suborder: Adephaga
- Family: Carabidae
- Tribe: Harpalini
- Subtribe: Stenolophina
- Genus: Stenolophus
- Species: S. spretus

Binomial name
- Stenolophus spretus Dejean, 1831

Species of beetle

Stenolophus spretus is a species of ground beetle in the family Carabidae. It is found in North America.
