= Stenolophus maculatus =

Scientific classification
- Domain: Eukaryota
- Kingdom: Animalia
- Phylum: Arthropoda
- Class: Insecta
- Order: Coleoptera
- Suborder: Adephaga
- Family: Carabidae
- Subfamily: Harpalinae
- Tribe: Harpalini
- Subtribe: Stenolophina
- Genus: Stenolophus
- Species: S. maculatus

Binomial name
- Stenolophus maculatus (LeConte, 1869)

Species of beetle

Stenolophus maculatus is a species of ground beetle in the family Carabidae. It is endemic to North America.
