= Stenolophus fuscatus =

Scientific classification
- Kingdom: Animalia
- Phylum: Arthropoda
- Class: Insecta
- Order: Coleoptera
- Suborder: Adephaga
- Family: Carabidae
- Tribe: Harpalini
- Subtribe: Stenolophina
- Genus: Stenolophus
- Species: S. fuscatus

Binomial name
- Stenolophus fuscatus Dejean, 1829

Species of beetle

Stenolophus fuscatus is a species of ground beetle in the family Carabidae. It is found in North America.
