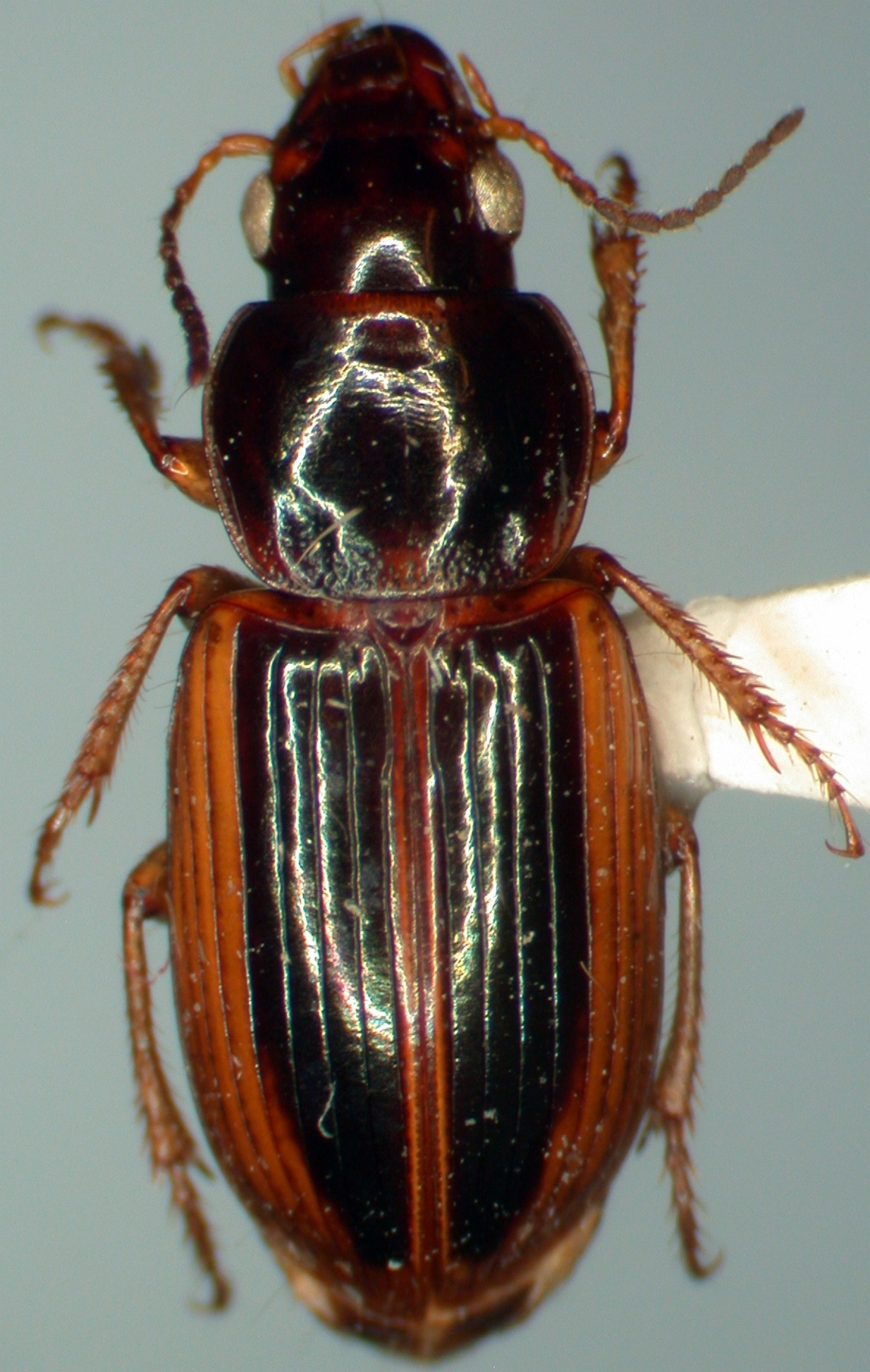

Scientific classification
- Kingdom: Animalia
- Phylum: Arthropoda
- Class: Insecta
- Order: Coleoptera
- Suborder: Adephaga
- Family: Carabidae
- Tribe: Harpalini
- Subtribe: Stenolophina
- Genus: Stenolophus
- Species: S. infuscatus

Binomial name
- Stenolophus infuscatus (Dejean, 1829)

= Stenolophus infuscatus =

Species of beetle

Stenolophus infuscatus is a species of ground beetle in the family Carabidae. It is found in North America.
