= Philodes rectangulus =

Scientific classification
- Domain: Eukaryota
- Kingdom: Animalia
- Phylum: Arthropoda
- Class: Insecta
- Order: Coleoptera
- Suborder: Adephaga
- Family: Carabidae
- Subfamily: Harpalinae
- Tribe: Harpalini
- Subtribe: Stenolophina
- Genus: Philodes
- Species: P. rectangulus

Binomial name
- Philodes rectangulus (Chaudoir, 1868)

Synonyms
- Acupalpus rectangulus Chaudoir, 1868

Species of beetle

Philodes rectangulus is a species of ground beetle in the family Carabidae. It is found in North America.
