= Pogonodaptus mexicanus =

Scientific classification
- Domain: Eukaryota
- Kingdom: Animalia
- Phylum: Arthropoda
- Class: Insecta
- Order: Coleoptera
- Suborder: Adephaga
- Family: Carabidae
- Subfamily: Harpalinae
- Tribe: Harpalini
- Subtribe: Stenolophina
- Genus: Pogonodaptus
- Species: P. mexicanus

Binomial name
- Pogonodaptus mexicanus (Bates, 1878)

Species of beetle

Pogonodaptus mexicanus is a species of ground beetle in the family Carabidae. It is found in Central America and North America.
