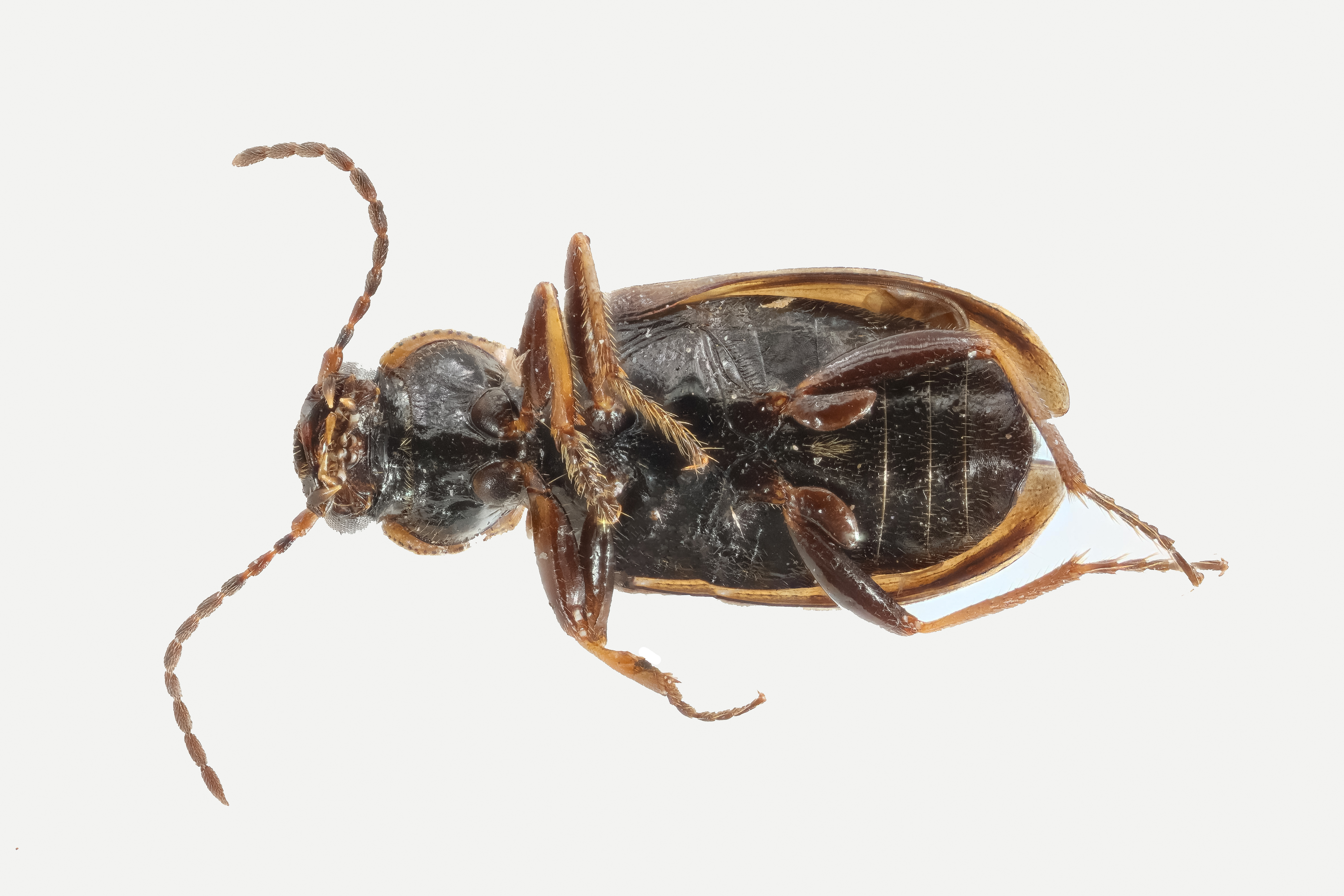

Scientific classification
- Kingdom: Animalia
- Phylum: Arthropoda
- Clade: Pancrustacea
- Class: Insecta
- Order: Coleoptera
- Suborder: Adephaga
- Family: Carabidae
- Tribe: Harpalini
- Subtribe: Stenolophina
- Genus: Dicheirotrichus
- Species: D. cognatus

Binomial name
- Dicheirotrichus cognatus (Gyllenhal, 1827)

= Dicheirotrichus cognatus =

Species of beetle

Dicheirotrichus cognatus is a species of ground beetle in the family Carabidae. It is found in Europe and Northern Asia (excluding China), Central America, and North America.
