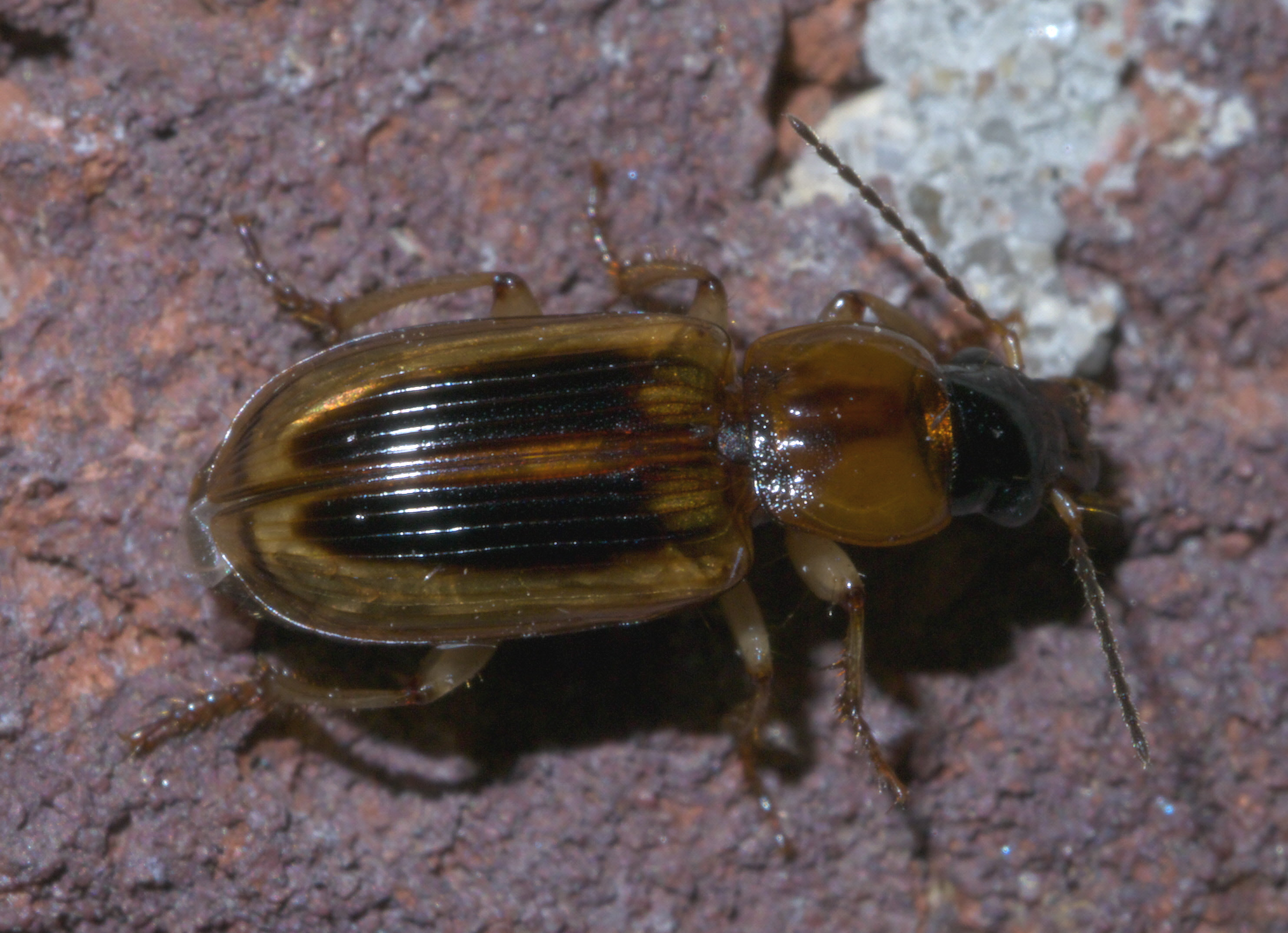
- Stenolophus comma, Oklahoma

Scientific classification
- Kingdom: Animalia
- Phylum: Arthropoda
- Clade: Pancrustacea
- Class: Insecta
- Order: Coleoptera
- Suborder: Adephaga
- Family: Carabidae
- Subfamily: Harpalinae
- Tribe: Harpalini
- Subtribe: Stenolophina
- Genus: Stenolophus
- Species: S. comma

Binomial name
- Stenolophus comma (Fabricius, 1775)

Synonyms
- Agonoderus comma (Fabricius, 1775); Carabus comma Fabricius, 1775; Stenolophus dorsalis (LeConte, 1847); Stenolophus gracilitarsis (Casey, 1914); Stenolophus latipennis (Casey, 1914); Stenolophus obliquulus (Casey, 1914); Stenolophus oculatus (Casey, 1914); Stenolophus pallescens (Casey, 1914); Stenolophus quadricollis (Casey, 1914); Stenolophus similis (Kirby, 1837); Trechus similis Kirby, 1837

= Stenolophus comma =

Species of beetles

Stenolophus comma is a ground beetle in the genus Stenolophus ("seedcorn beetles"), in the family Carabidae ("ground beetles"). It is found mainly in North America.
