= Stenolophus anceps =

Scientific classification
- Domain: Eukaryota
- Kingdom: Animalia
- Phylum: Arthropoda
- Class: Insecta
- Order: Coleoptera
- Suborder: Adephaga
- Family: Carabidae
- Subfamily: Harpalinae
- Tribe: Harpalini
- Subtribe: Stenolophina
- Genus: Stenolophus
- Species: S. anceps

Binomial name
- Stenolophus anceps Leconte, 1857

Synonyms
- Stenolophus peregrinus Casey, 1914; Stenolophus rotundicollis Motschulsky, 1859

Species of beetle

Stenolophus anceps is a species of ground beetle in the family Carabidae. It is found in North America.
