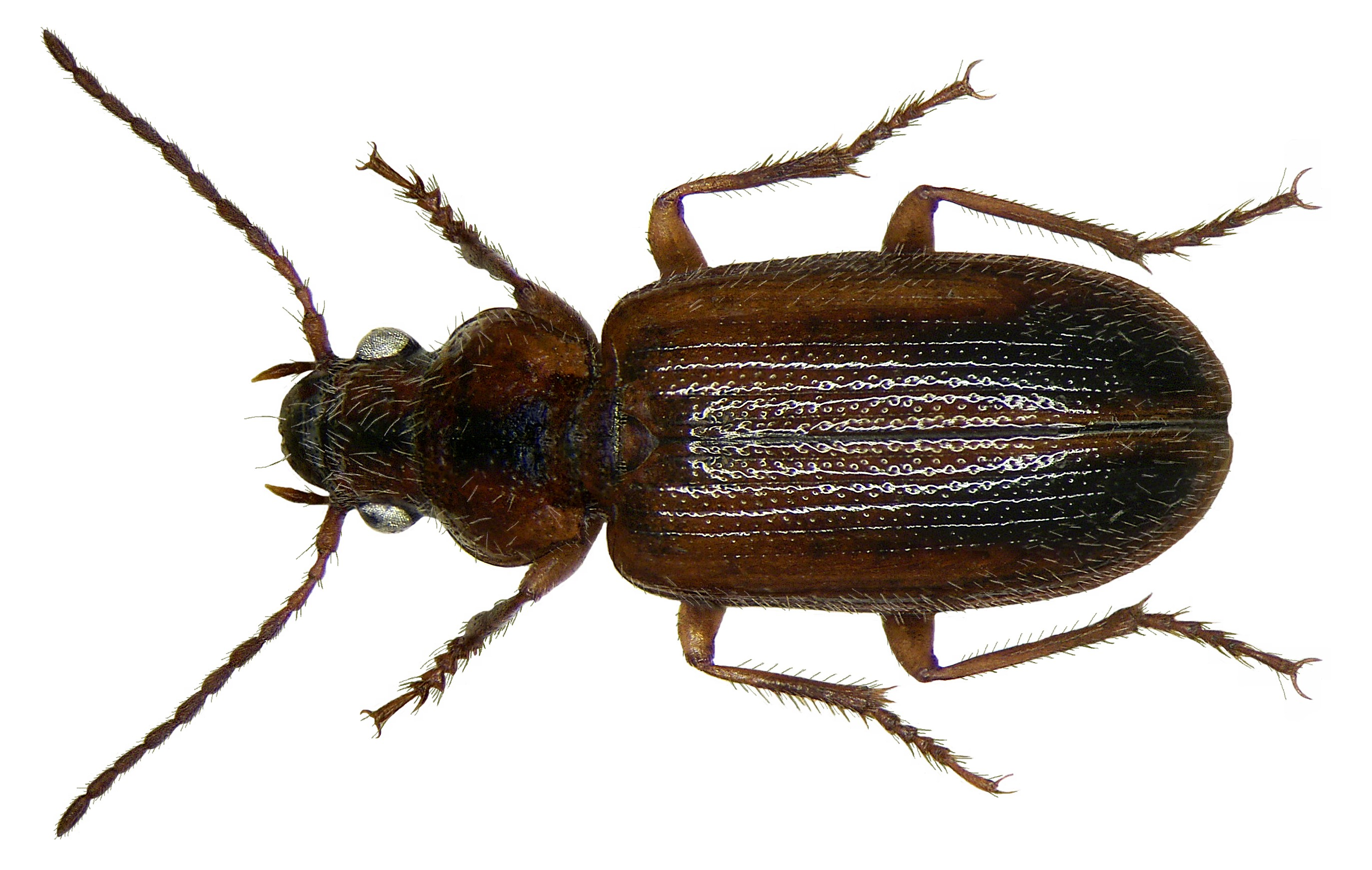
- Dicheirotrichus gustavii

Scientific classification
- Domain: Eukaryota
- Kingdom: Animalia
- Phylum: Arthropoda
- Class: Insecta
- Order: Coleoptera
- Suborder: Adephaga
- Family: Carabidae
- Subfamily: Harpalinae
- Tribe: Harpalini
- Subtribe: Stenolophina
- Genus: Dicheirotrichus; Jacquelin du Val, 1855

Subgenera
- Cardiostenus Tschitscherine, 1900; Dicheirotrichus Jacquelin du Val, 1855; Oreoxenus Tschitscherine, 1899; Pelagophilus Tschitscherine, 1901; Trichocellus Ganglbauer, 1891

= Dicheirotrichus =

Genus of beetles

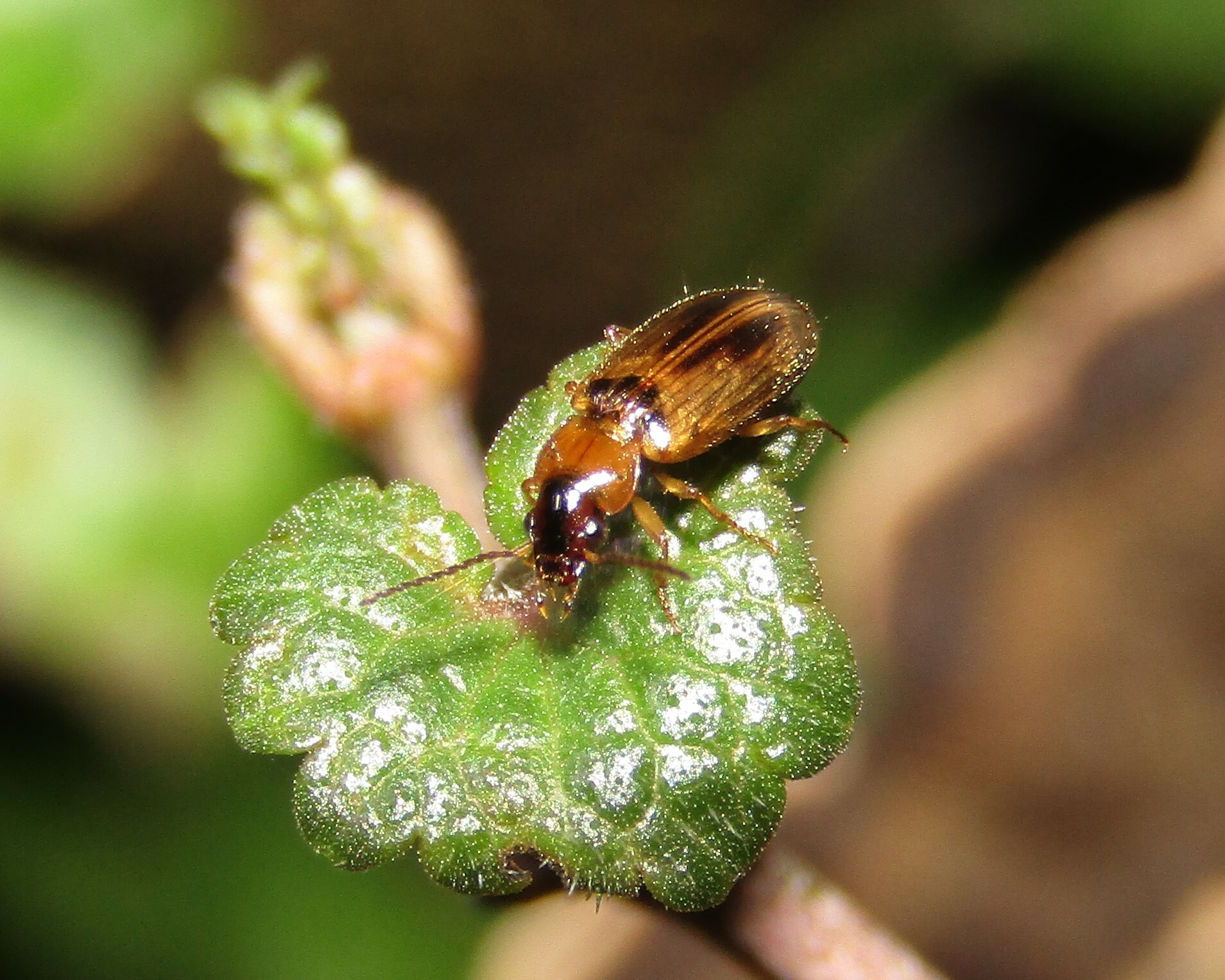
Dicheirotrichus, Russia

Dicheirotrichus is a genus in the beetle family Carabidae. There are more than 50 described species in Dicheirotrichus.

== Species ==
These 51 species belong to the genus Dicheirotrichus:

- Dicheirotrichus abdominalis (Motschulsky, 1844)
- Dicheirotrichus alticola Bates, 1878
- Dicheirotrichus angularis (Reitter in Tschitscherine, 1899)
- Dicheirotrichus angustulus J.Sahlberg, 1880
- Dicheirotrichus arnoldii (Kryzhanovskij & Atamuradov, 1989)
- Dicheirotrichus bradycelliformis Reitter, 1900
- Dicheirotrichus chloroticus (Dejean, 1829)
- Dicheirotrichus cognatus (Gyllenhal, 1827)
- Dicheirotrichus coreanus Mlynar, 1974
- Dicheirotrichus cymindiformis (Reitter, 1901)
- Dicheirotrichus desertus (Motschulsky, 1849)
- Dicheirotrichus discicollis (Dejean, 1829)
- Dicheirotrichus discolor (Faldermann, 1836)
- Dicheirotrichus externepunctatus (Reitter in Tschitscherine, 1899)
- Dicheirotrichus glasunowi (Tschitscherine, 1899)
- Dicheirotrichus godarti (E.Jacquet, 1882)
- Dicheirotrichus grumi (Tschitscherine, 1899)
- Dicheirotrichus gustavii Crotch, 1871
- Dicheirotrichus hauseri (Reitter in F.Hauser, 1894)
- Dicheirotrichus henoni (Bedel in Tschitscherine, 1899)
- Dicheirotrichus himalayanus Kataev & Wrase, 2006
- Dicheirotrichus kozlowi (Tschitscherine, 1899)
- Dicheirotrichus lacustris (L.Redtenbacher, 1856)
- Dicheirotrichus latimanus Kataev & Wrase, 2006
- Dicheirotrichus maculicollis (Reitter in F.Hauser, 1894)
- Dicheirotrichus mannerheimii (R.F.Sahlberg, 1844)
- Dicheirotrichus medvedevi (Kabak & Kataev, 1993)
- Dicheirotrichus microderus (Solsky, 1874)
- Dicheirotrichus obscuricollis (Reitter in Tschitscherine, 1899)
- Dicheirotrichus obscuricornis (Reitter in Tschitscherine, 1899)
- Dicheirotrichus obsoletus (Dejean, 1829)
- Dicheirotrichus pallidus (Dejean, 1829)
- Dicheirotrichus parvicollis (Tschitscherine, 1900)
- Dicheirotrichus pevtsovi Kataev & Kabak, 2015
- Dicheirotrichus placidus (Gyllenhal, 1827)
- Dicheirotrichus potanini (Tschitscherine, 1899)
- Dicheirotrichus punctatellus (Reitter in F.Hauser, 1894)
- Dicheirotrichus punicus Bedel, 1899
- Dicheirotrichus roborowskii (Tschitscherine, 1899)
- Dicheirotrichus rufithorax (C.R.Sahlberg, 1827)
- Dicheirotrichus semenowi (Tschitscherine, 1899)
- Dicheirotrichus sichuanensis Kataev & Wrase, 1996
- Dicheirotrichus stenothorax (Kabak & Kataev, 1993)
- Dicheirotrichus subangularis Kataev & Wrase, 2006
- Dicheirotrichus tenuimanus Bates, 1873
- Dicheirotrichus tolli Kataev & Shilenkov, 1996
- Dicheirotrichus transcaspicus (Tschitscherine, 1899)
- Dicheirotrichus tscheresovae (Komarov, 1995)
- Dicheirotrichus tschitscherini (Reitter in Tschitscherine, 1899)
- Dicheirotrichus ustulatus (Dejean, 1829)
- † Dicheirotrichus lividus Heer, 1862
