= Polpochila erro =

Scientific classification
- Domain: Eukaryota
- Kingdom: Animalia
- Phylum: Arthropoda
- Class: Insecta
- Order: Coleoptera
- Suborder: Adephaga
- Family: Carabidae
- Subfamily: Harpalinae
- Tribe: Harpalini
- Genus: Polpochila
- Species: P. erro

Binomial name
- Polpochila erro (LeConte, 1854)

Species of beetle

Polpochila erro is a species of ground beetle in the family Carabidae. It is found in North America.
