= Agonoleptus rotundatus =

Scientific classification
- Domain: Eukaryota
- Kingdom: Animalia
- Phylum: Arthropoda
- Class: Insecta
- Order: Coleoptera
- Suborder: Adephaga
- Family: Carabidae
- Subfamily: Harpalinae
- Tribe: Harpalini
- Genus: Agonoleptus
- Species: A. rotundatus

Binomial name
- Agonoleptus rotundatus (LeConte, 1863)

Synonyms
- Stenolophus rotundatus LeConte, 1863

Species of beetle

Agonoleptus rotundatus is a species of ground beetle in the family Carabidae. It is found in North America.
