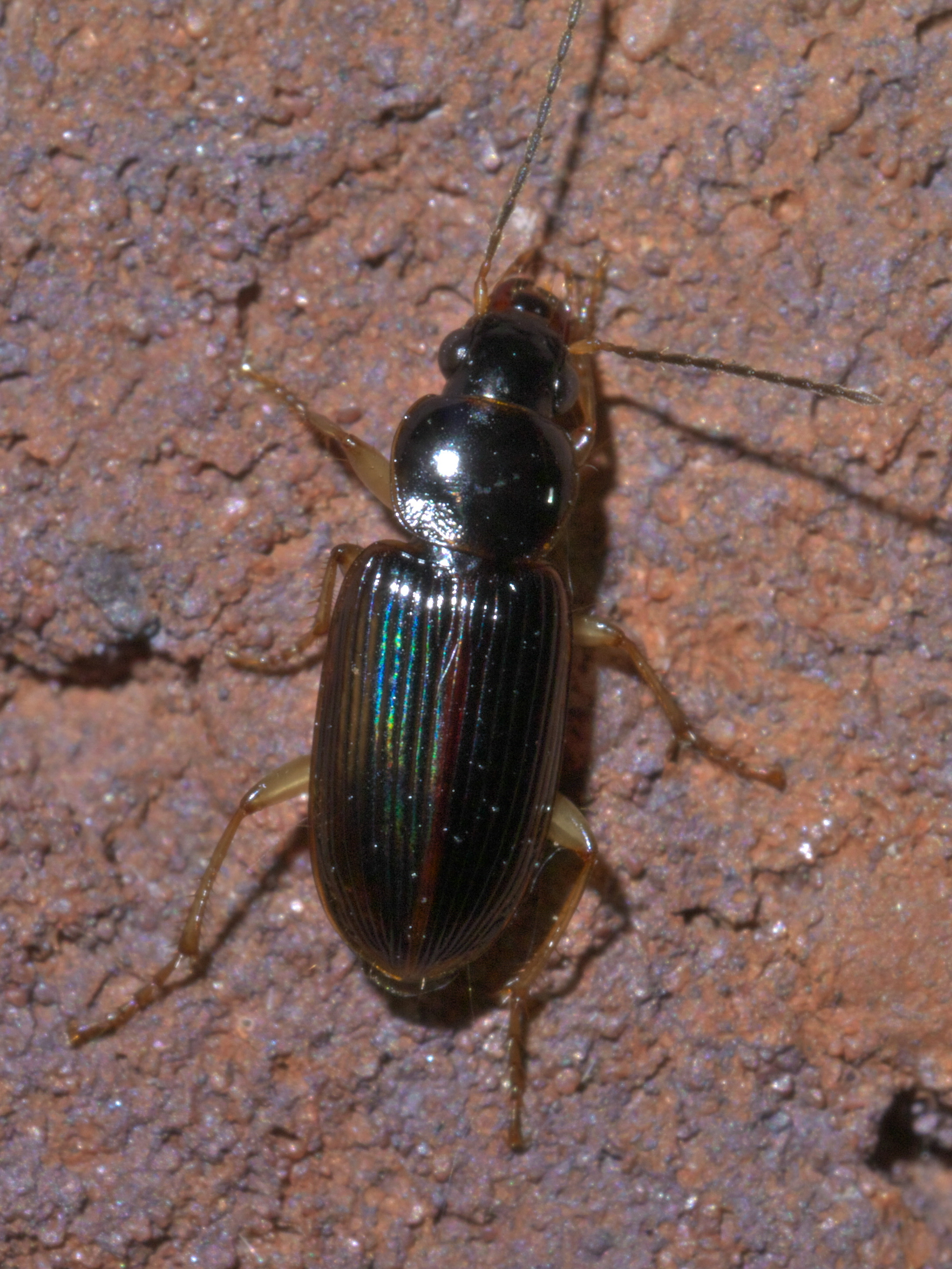

Scientific classification
- Domain: Eukaryota
- Kingdom: Animalia
- Phylum: Arthropoda
- Class: Insecta
- Order: Coleoptera
- Suborder: Adephaga
- Family: Carabidae
- Subfamily: Harpalinae
- Tribe: Harpalini
- Genus: Stenolophus
- Species: S. ochropezus

Binomial name
- Stenolophus ochropezus (Say, 1823)

Synonyms
- Acupalpus laticollis (Motschulsky, 1864); Stenolophus laticollis Motschulsky, 1864

= Stenolophus ochropezus =

Species of beetle

Stenolophus ochropezus is a species of ground beetle in the family Carabidae. It is found in North America.

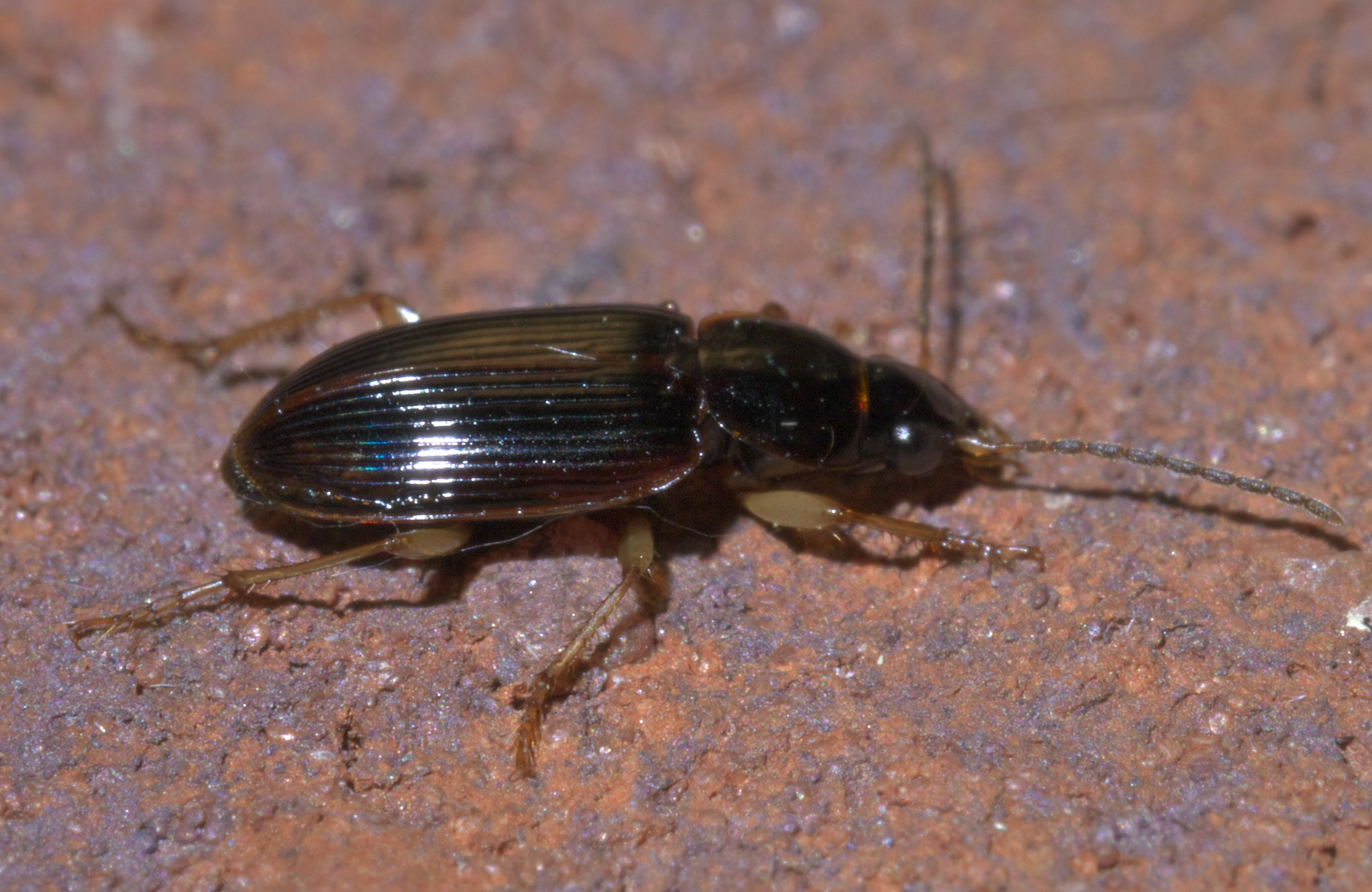
