= Agonoleptus convexulus =

Scientific classification
- Domain: Eukaryota
- Kingdom: Animalia
- Phylum: Arthropoda
- Class: Insecta
- Order: Coleoptera
- Suborder: Adephaga
- Family: Carabidae
- Subfamily: Harpalinae
- Tribe: Harpalini
- Genus: Agonoleptus
- Species: A. convexulus

Binomial name
- Agonoleptus convexulus (Darlington, 1934)

Synonyms
- Acupalpus convexulus Darlington, 1934

Species of beetle

Agonoleptus convexulus is an insect-eating ground beetle of the Agonoleptus genus. It was first discovered in Cuba.
