= Agonoleptus thoracicus =

Scientific classification
- Kingdom: Animalia
- Phylum: Arthropoda
- Class: Insecta
- Order: Coleoptera
- Suborder: Adephaga
- Family: Carabidae
- Genus: Agonoleptus
- Species: A. thoracicus

Binomial name
- Agonoleptus thoracicus (Casey, 1914)

Species of beetle

Agonoleptus thoracicus is a species of ground beetle in the family Carabidae. It is found in North America.
