= Philodes =

Scientific classification
- Kingdom: Animalia
- Phylum: Arthropoda
- Class: Insecta
- Order: Coleoptera
- Suborder: Adephaga
- Family: Carabidae
- Subfamily: Harpalinae
- Tribe: Harpalini
- Subtribe: Stenolophina
- Genus: Philodes; LeConte, 1861

Subgenera
- Philodes (Goniolophus) Casey, 1914; Philodes (Philodes) LeConte, 1861

Genus of beetles

Philodes is a genus of ground beetles in the family Carabidae. There are at least four described species in Philodes.

== Species ==
These four species belong to the genus Philodes:

- Philodes alternans (LeConte, 1853)
- Philodes flavilimbus (LeConte, 1869)
- Philodes longulus (Dejean, 1829)
- Philodes rectangulus (Chaudoir, 1868)
