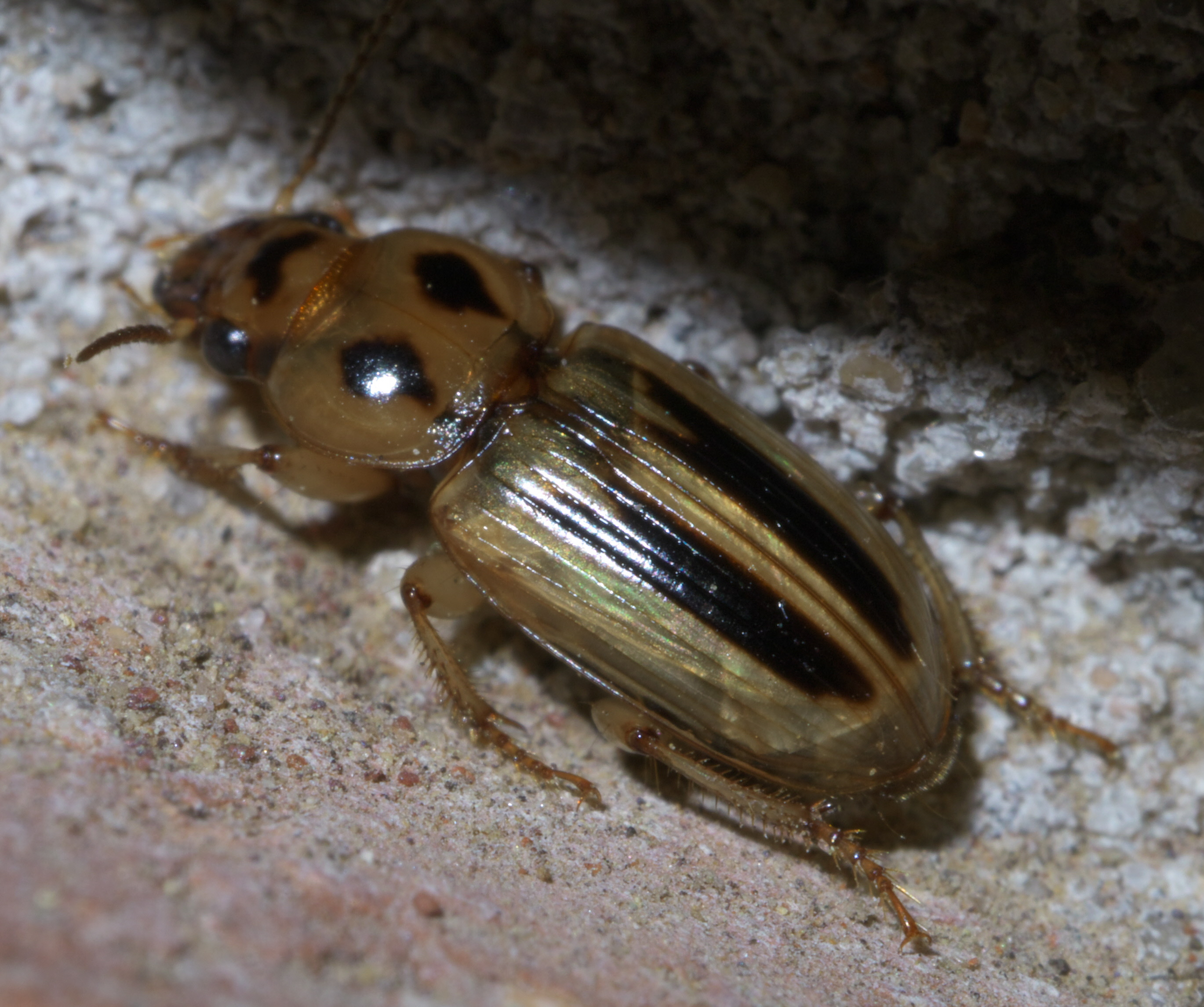

Scientific classification
- Domain: Eukaryota
- Kingdom: Animalia
- Phylum: Arthropoda
- Class: Insecta
- Order: Coleoptera
- Suborder: Adephaga
- Family: Carabidae
- Subfamily: Harpalinae
- Tribe: Harpalini
- Genus: Stenolophus
- Species: S. lineola

Binomial name
- Stenolophus lineola (Fabricius, 1775)

= Stenolophus lineola =

Species of beetle

Stenolophus lineola is a species of ground beetle in the family Carabidae. It is found in North America.

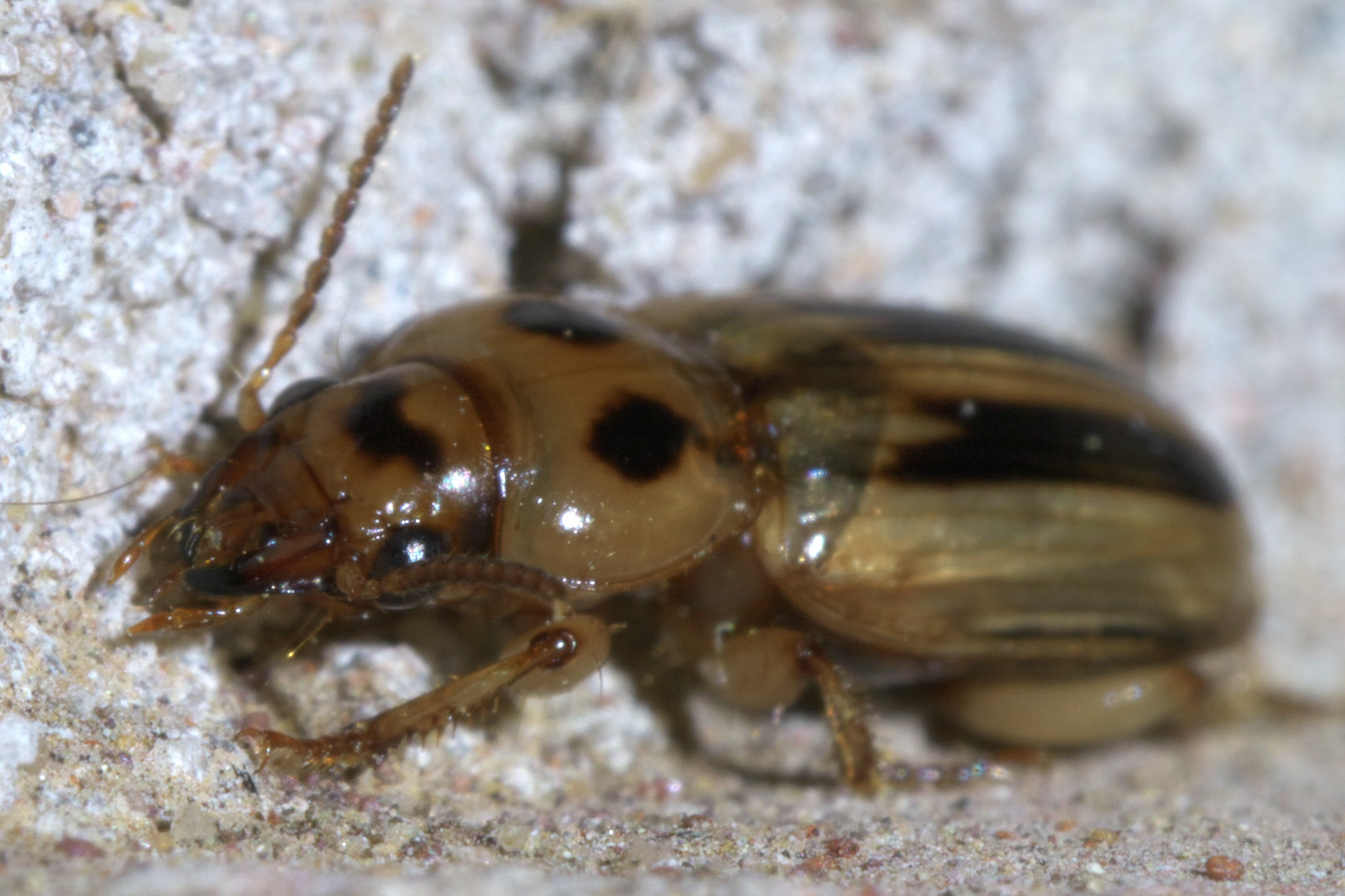
