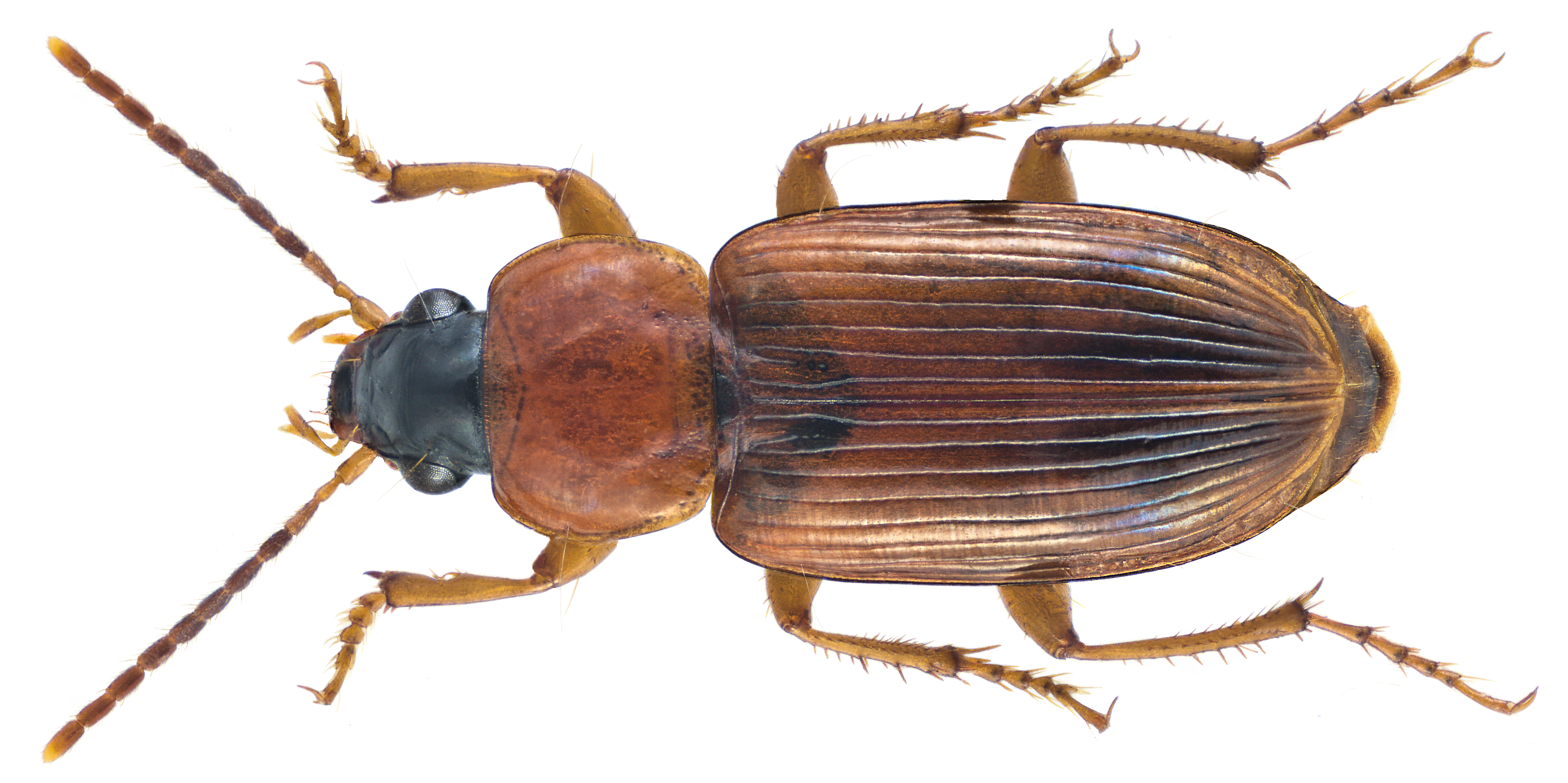
- Stenolophus abdominalis

Scientific classification
- Kingdom: Animalia
- Phylum: Arthropoda
- Class: Insecta
- Order: Coleoptera
- Suborder: Adephaga
- Family: Carabidae
- Tribe: Harpalini
- Subtribe: Stenolophina
- Genus: Stenolophus; Dejean, 1821

Subgenera
- Agonoderus Dejean, 1829; Astenolophus Habu, 1973; Egadroma Motschulsky, 1855; Stenolophus Dejean, 1821

= Stenolophus =

Genus of beetles

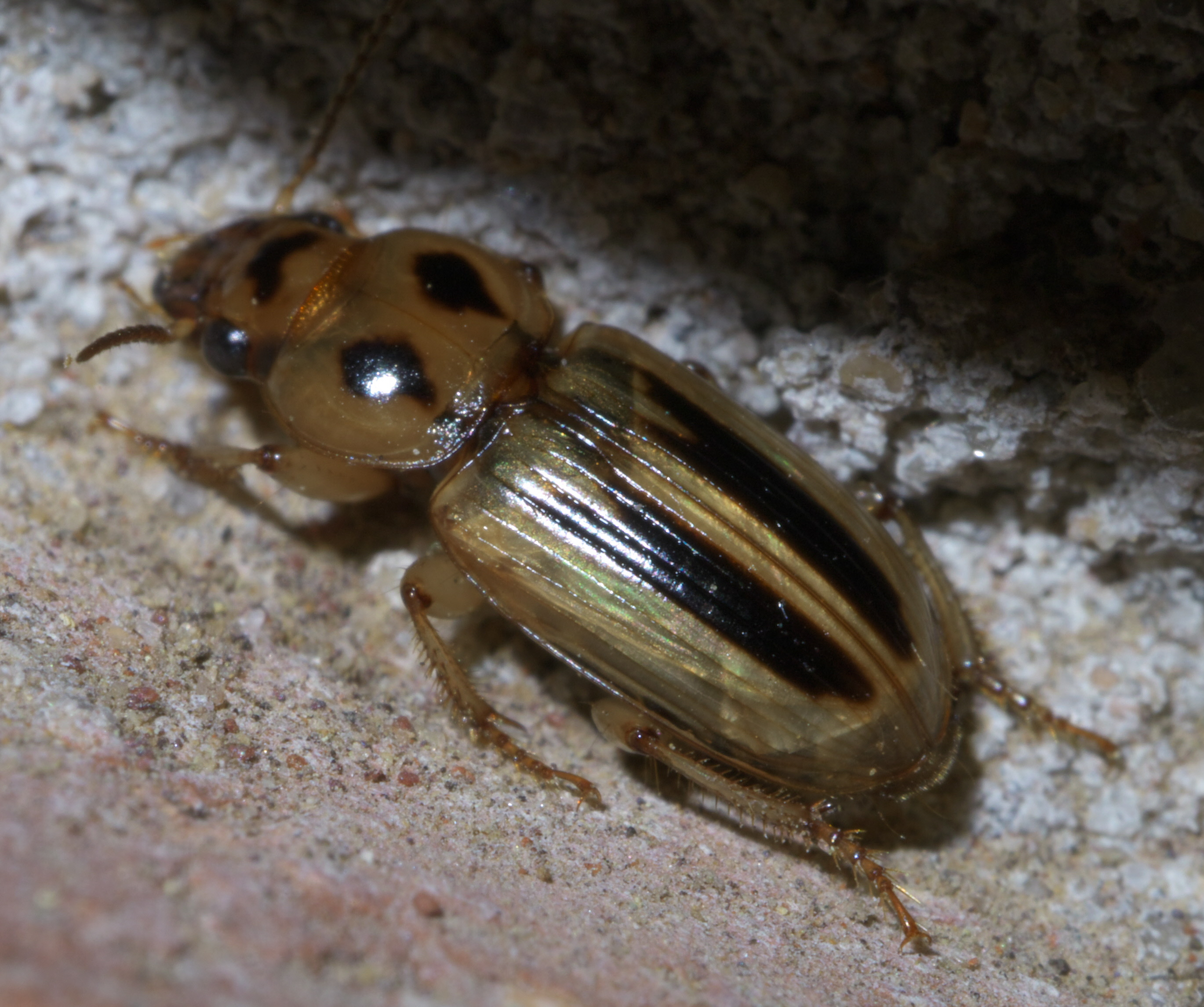
Stenolophus lineola

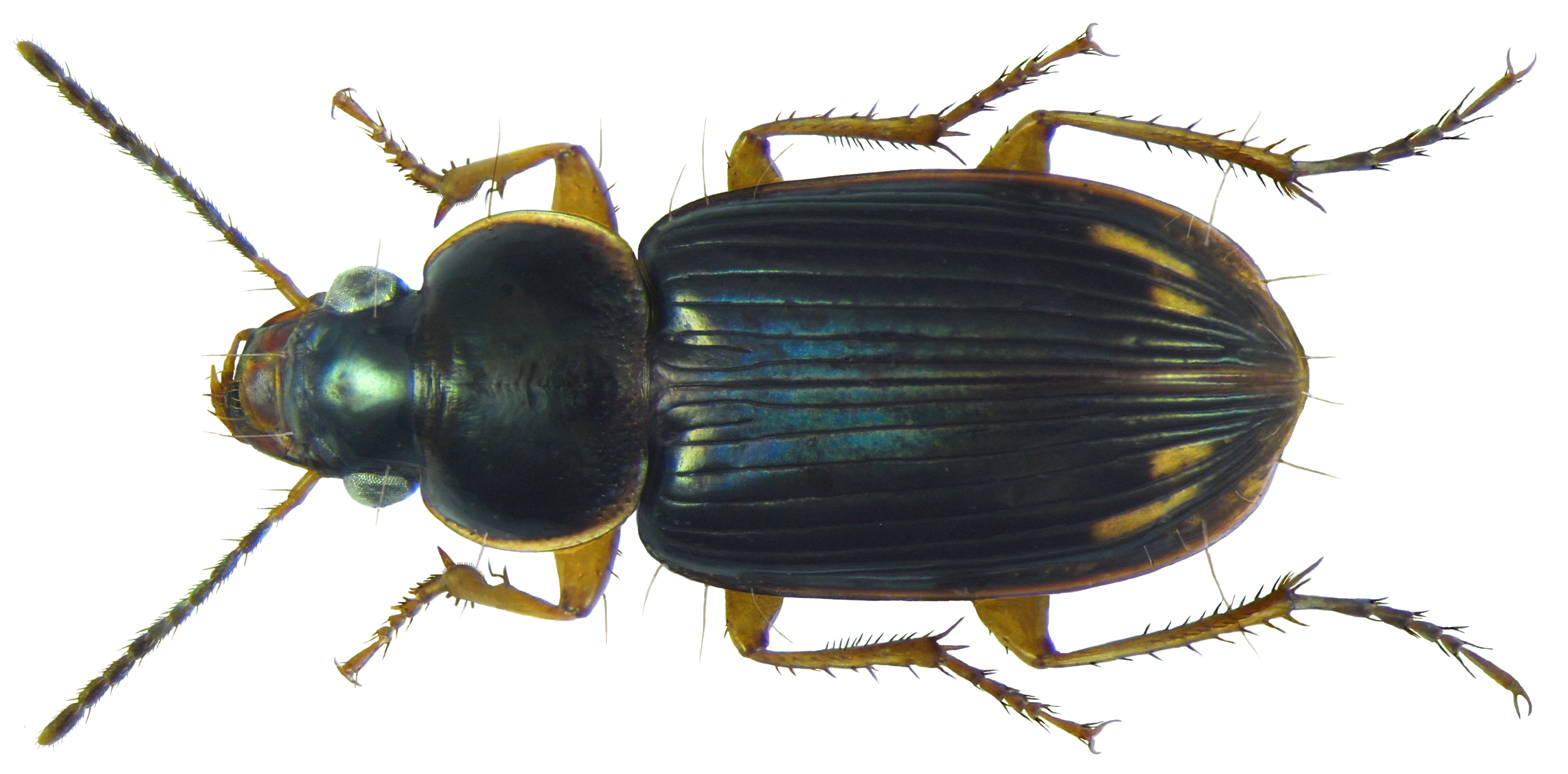
Stenolophus smaragdulus

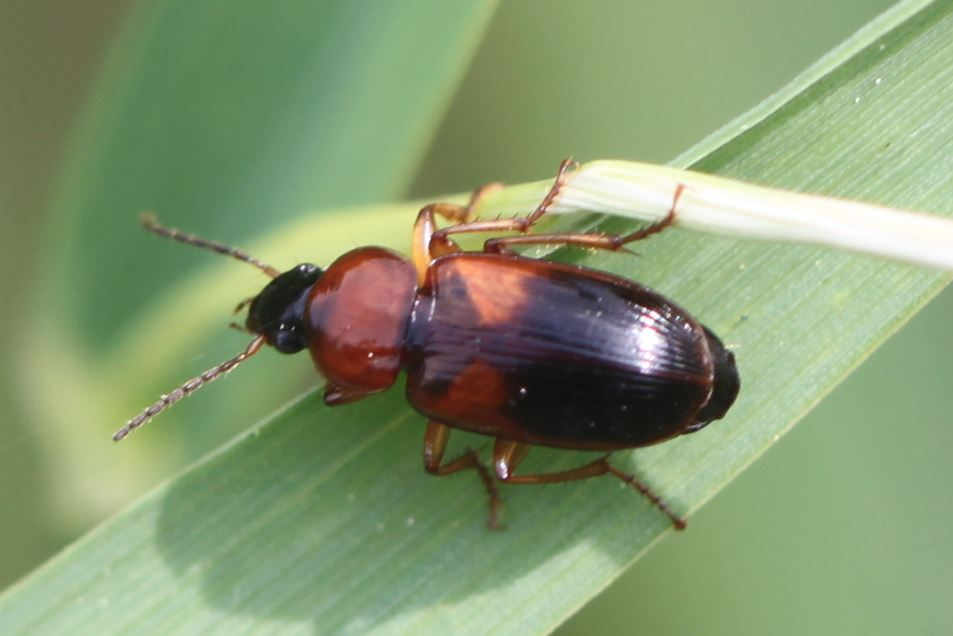
Stenolophus teutonus

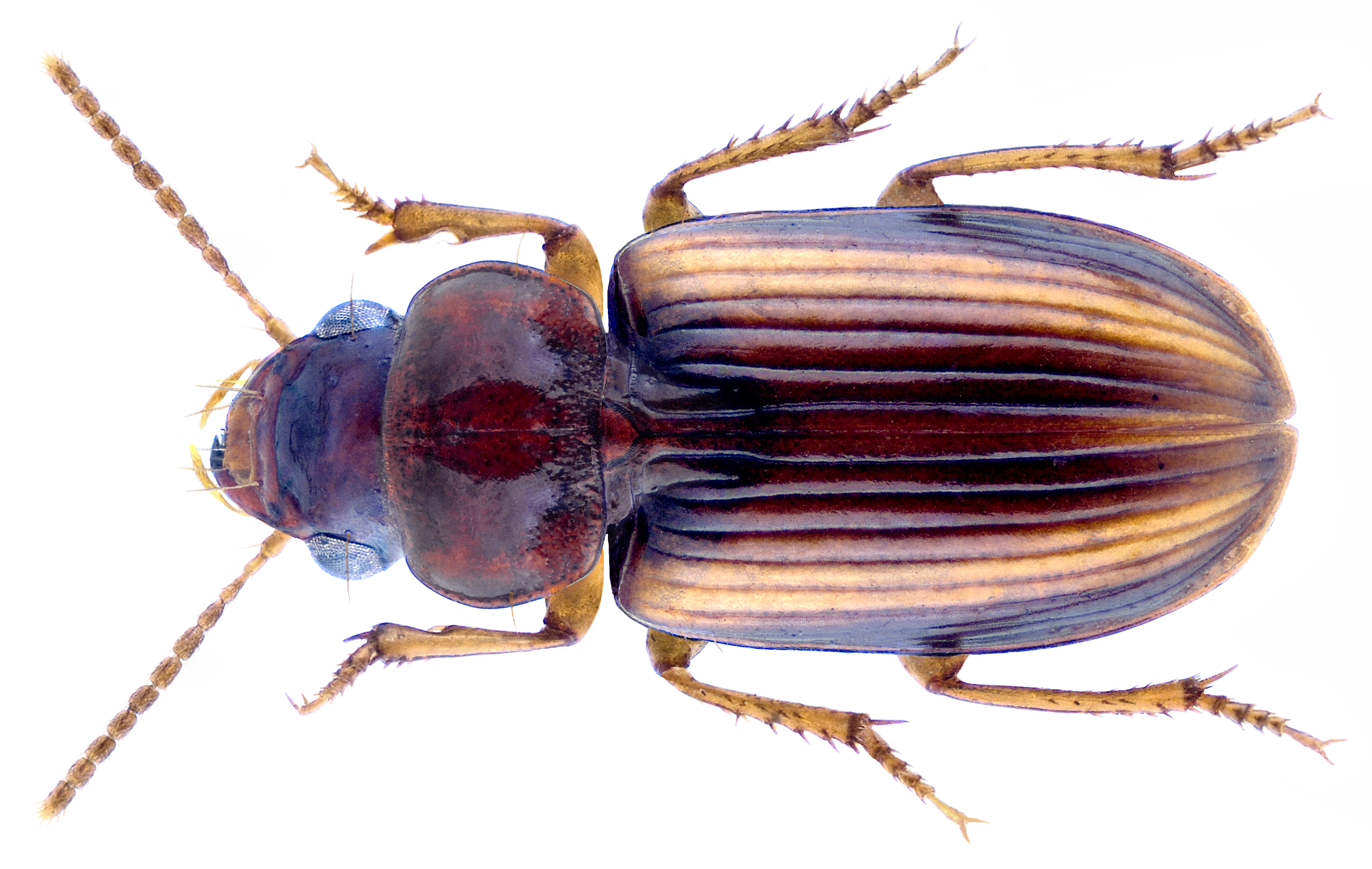
Stenolophus bilineatus

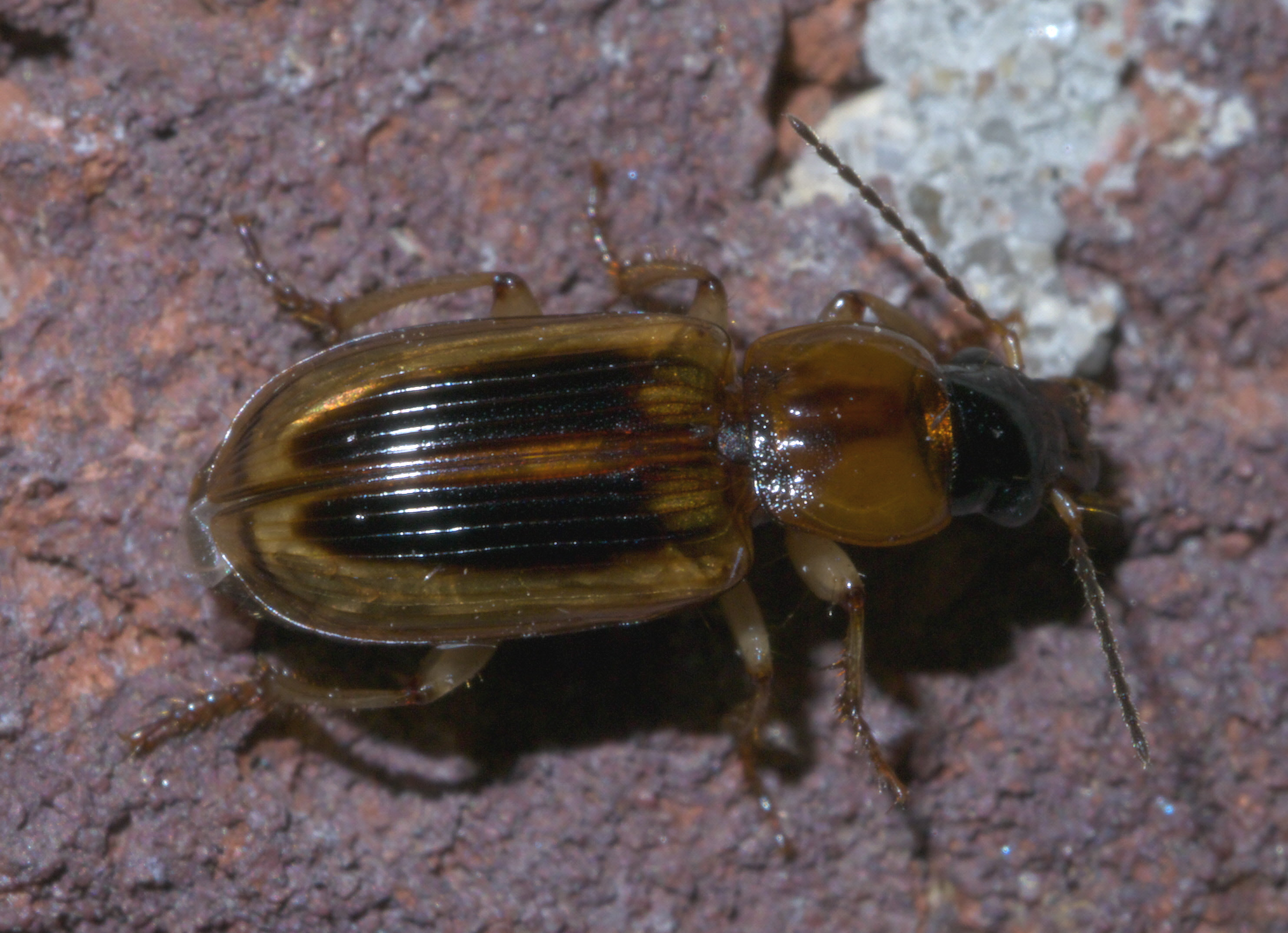
Stenolophus comma

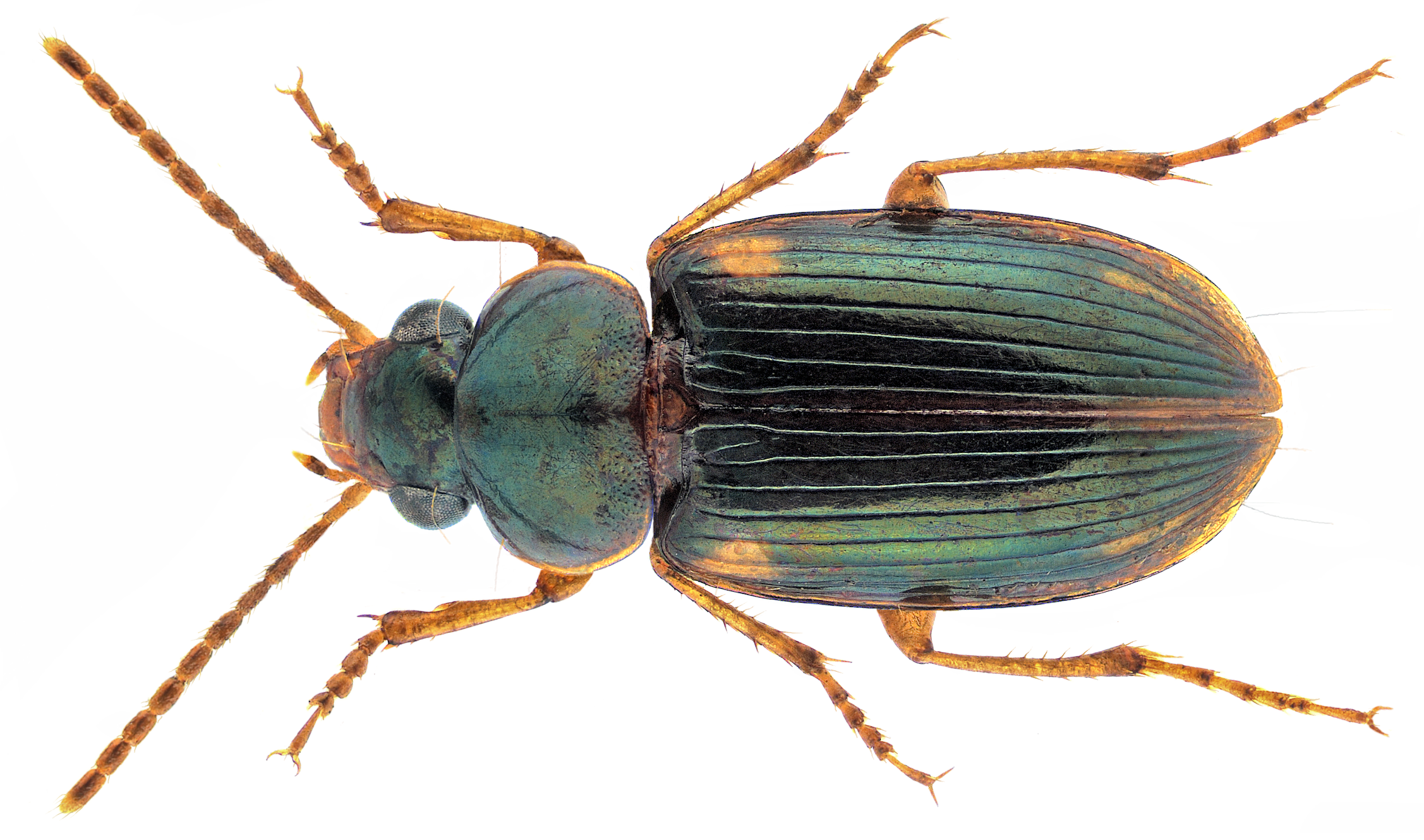
Stenolophus viriditinctus

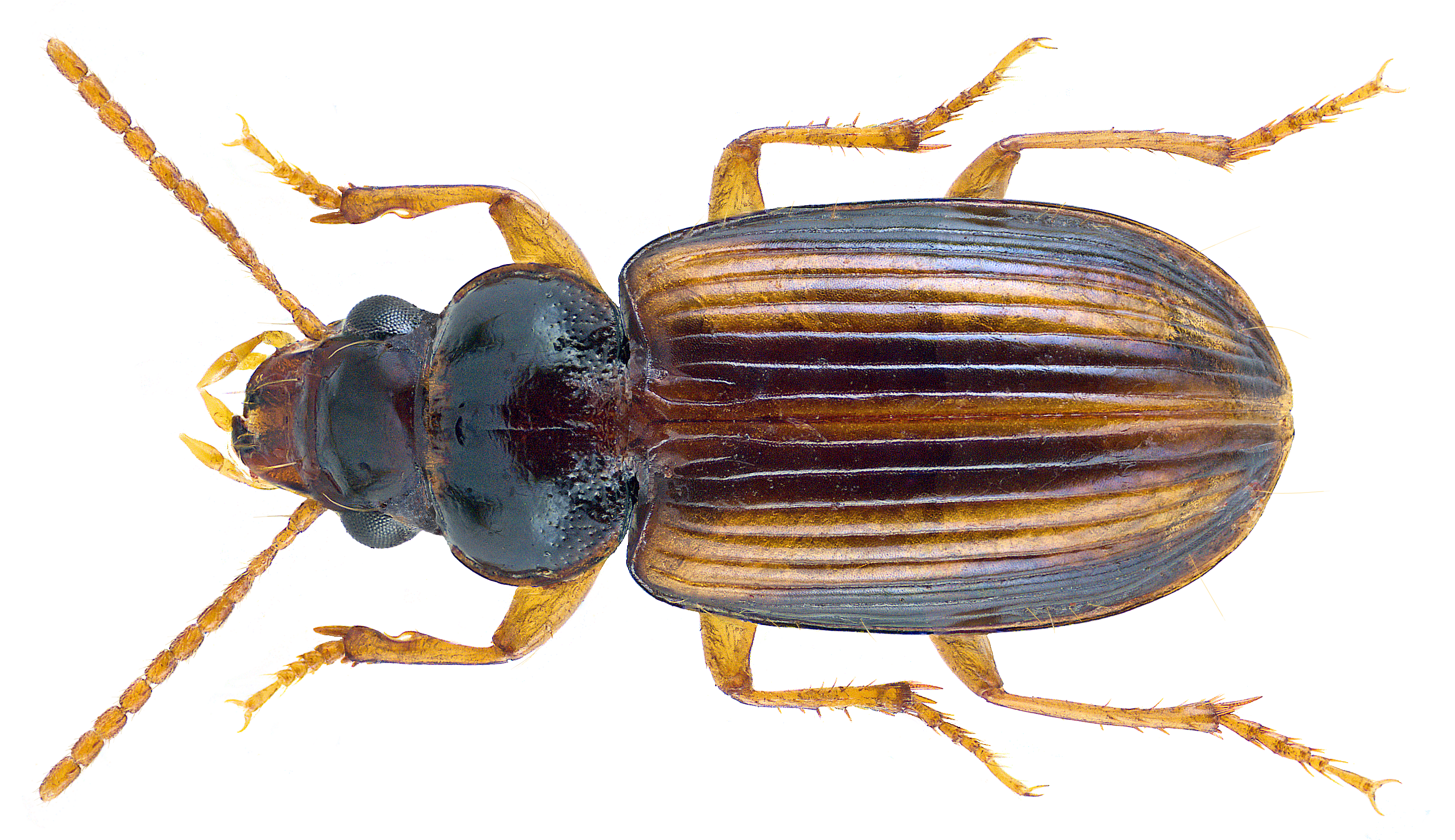
Stenolophus trivittis

Stenolophus is a genus of beetles in the family Carabidae. There are more than 190 described species in the genus Stenolophus.

== Species ==
These 191 species belong to the genus Stenolophus:

Subgenus Agonoderus Dejean, 1829
Stenolophus binotatus (Casey, 1914)
Stenolophus comma (Fabricius, 1775)
Stenolophus infuscatus (Dejean, 1829)
Stenolophus lecontei (Chaudoir, 1868)
Stenolophus lineola (Fabricius, 1775)
Stenolophus maculatus (LeConte, 1869)
Stenolophus rugicollis (LeConte, 1859)
Subgenus Astenolophus Habu, 1973
Stenolophus andrewesi Landin, 1955
Stenolophus asakawaensis Habu, 1973
Stenolophus bousqueti N.Ito, 1997
Stenolophus fulvicornis Bates, 1873
Stenolophus karasawai Tanaka, 1962
Stenolophus meyeri (Jedlicka, 1935)
Stenolophus rufoabdominalis Kataev, 1997
Stenolophus rufolimbatus (Jedlicka, 1935)
Stenolophus schaubergeri (Jedlicka, 1935)
Stenolophus shirakii Habu, 1973
Stenolophus uenoi Habu, 1975
Subgenus Egadroma Motschulsky, 1855

Stenolophus alacer Péringuey, 1896
Stenolophus angolanus (Basilewsky, 1948)
Stenolophus bajaurae Andrewes, 1924
Stenolophus balli (Basilewsky, 1947)
Stenolophus barbarae Facchini, 2012
Stenolophus basirufus (Basilewsky, 1948)
Stenolophus bilineatus Facchini, 2016
Stenolophus brevicornis (Jeannel, 1948)
Stenolophus brittoni (Basilewsky, 1948)
Stenolophus caeruleus Blackburn, 1890
Stenolophus camerunensis Facchini, 2016
Stenolophus capensis Péringuey, 1896
Stenolophus columbinus Erichson, 1843
Stenolophus comptus Erichson, 1843
Stenolophus concinnus Dejean, 1829
Stenolophus congoensis (Burgeon, 1936)
Stenolophus cyclops (Darlington, 1968)
Stenolophus difficilis (Hope, 1845)
Stenolophus discriminatus (Basilewsky, 1948)
Stenolophus dollmani (Basilewsky, 1946)
Stenolophus dorsiger Fairmaire, 1869
Stenolophus dumainei Coquerel, 1866
Stenolophus electus (Basilewsky, 1948)
Stenolophus elegans Péringuey, 1896
Stenolophus elegantulus (Péringuey, 1892)
Stenolophus fenestratus (Burgeon, 1936)
Stenolophus fugax Dejean, 1829
Stenolophus genieri Facchini, 2012
Stenolophus germanus Chaudoir, 1878
Stenolophus humeralis (Dejean, 1831)
Stenolophus humeroguttatus Facchini, 2016
Stenolophus interruptus Chaudoir, 1876
Stenolophus iridescens Klug, 1833
Stenolophus irinorufus Fairmaire, 1869
Stenolophus irinoviridis Fairmaire, 1869
Stenolophus jaegeri Facchini, 2012
Stenolophus jeanneli (Basilewsky, 1948)
Stenolophus kivuensis (Burgeon, 1936)
Stenolophus kmecoi (Facchini, 2003)
Stenolophus kusamai Habu, 1977
Stenolophus lamottei (Basilewsky, 1951)
Stenolophus laticollis (Jeannel, 1948)
Stenolophus latipennis (Jeannel, 1948)
Stenolophus linearis (Jeannel, 1948)
Stenolophus lucidus Dejean, 1829
Stenolophus madagascariensis Facchini, 2012
Stenolophus major (Basilewsky, 1968)
Stenolophus marginatus Dejean, 1829
Stenolophus marshalli (Basilewsky, 1946)
Stenolophus melniki Kataev & Wrase, 2013
Stenolophus metrius (Basilewsky, 1951)
Stenolophus micans Erichson, 1842
Stenolophus mjobergi Kataev, 1997
Stenolophus motoensis (Burgeon, 1936)
Stenolophus natalicus (Péringuey, 1896)
Stenolophus neghellianus (G.Müller, 1942)
Stenolophus nepalensis (Jedlicka, 1965)
Stenolophus nigerianus (Basilewsky, 1951)
Stenolophus nitens (Motschulsky, 1864)
Stenolophus nitidulus Boheman, 1848
Stenolophus obockianus (Fairmaire, 1892)
Stenolophus obscuripes (G.Müller, 1942)
Stenolophus obscurus (Blackburn, 1888)
Stenolophus occiduus Facchini, 2012
Stenolophus ovatulus (Bates, 1889)
Stenolophus ovchinnikovi Kataev & Wrase, 2013
Stenolophus pallipes (Perroud & Montrouzier, 1864)
Stenolophus parallelus (Mjöberg, 1905)
Stenolophus pauliani (Basilewsky, 1948)
Stenolophus perrieri (Jeannel, 1948)
Stenolophus piceus (Guérin-Méneville, 1830)
Stenolophus plagifer (Klug, 1853)
Stenolophus planicostatus (Basilewsky, 1951)
Stenolophus planicostis Facchini, 2012
Stenolophus promptus Klug, 1853
Stenolophus pseudoobockianus Felix & Muilwijk in Felix, 2009
Stenolophus pseudorelucens Facchini, 2016
Stenolophus pseudovariolatus Facchini, 2016
Stenolophus quadrimaculatus (W.J.MacLeay, 1888)
Stenolophus quadripustulatus (Dejean, 1829)
Stenolophus quinquepustulatus (Wiedemann, 1823)
Stenolophus rectifrons Bates, 1892
Stenolophus relucens Erichson, 1843
Stenolophus rhodesianus (Basilewsky, 1948)
Stenolophus robustus Sloane, 1907
Stenolophus rufithorax Jedlicka, 1960
Stenolophus rufiventris LaFerté-Sénectère, 1853
Stenolophus ruthmuelleri Facchini, 2012
Stenolophus ruwenzoricus (Burgeon, 1936)
Stenolophus satoi Habu, 1973
Stenolophus scapularis (Dejean, 1831)
Stenolophus schoutedeni (Burgeon, 1936)
Stenolophus sicardi (Jeannel, 1948)
Stenolophus silvestrii (Basilewsky, 1951)
Stenolophus similatus Facchini, 2016
Stenolophus simillimus Facchini, 2016
Stenolophus smaragdulus (Fabricius, 1798)
Stenolophus splendidus Motschulsky, 1864
Stenolophus straneoi (G.Müller, 1942)
Stenolophus subrobustus (Schauberger, 1938)
Stenolophus suturalis W.J.MacLeay, 1888
Stenolophus terminalis (Péringuey, 1896)
Stenolophus tessellatus (Péringuey, 1892)
Stenolophus toledanoi Facchini, 2012
Stenolophus trivittis Fairmaire, 1869
Stenolophus uhligi Facchini, 2012
Stenolophus urundianus (Basilewsky, 1956)
Stenolophus vandenbulckei (Basilewsky, 1951)
Stenolophus variolatus (Basilewsky, 1956)
Stenolophus viridescens Jedlicka, 1935
Stenolophus vittiger (Klug, 1853)
Stenolophus yonaguniensis Habu, 1977
Stenolophus yunnanus (Jedlicka, 1935)
Stenolophus zambezianus (Basilewsky, 1948)
Stenolophus zambiensis Facchini, 2016
Stenolophus zarcoi (Basilewsky, 1952)

Subgenus Stenolophus Dejean, 1821

Stenolophus abdominalis Gené, 1836
Stenolophus agonoides Bates, 1883
Stenolophus anceps LeConte, 1857
Stenolophus arcuaticollis N.Ito, 1997
Stenolophus badius Erichson, 1847
Stenolophus carbo Bousquet in Bousquet & Larochelle, 1993
Stenolophus castaneipennis Bates, 1873
Stenolophus charis Bates, 1892
Stenolophus cincticollis LeConte, 1858
Stenolophus cinctipennis Boheman, 1858
Stenolophus connotatus Bates, 1873
Stenolophus cruentatus Chevrolat, 1858
Stenolophus debilis Erichson, 1847
Stenolophus discophorus (Fischer von Waldheim, 1823)
Stenolophus dissimilis Dejean, 1829
Stenolophus doiinthanonus N.Ito, 2000
Stenolophus dorsalis Motschulsky, 1864
Stenolophus flavipes LeConte, 1858
Stenolophus fuliginosus Dejean, 1829
Stenolophus fuscatus Dejean, 1829
Stenolophus gonidius Bates, 1889
Stenolophus humidus Hamilton, 1893
Stenolophus impunctatus N.Ito, 2000
Stenolophus incultus Casey, 1914
Stenolophus iridicolor L.Redtenbacher, 1868
Stenolophus kurosai Tanaka, 1962
Stenolophus lentulus Erichson, 1847
Stenolophus liebmanni G.Müller, 1931
Stenolophus limbalis LeConte, 1857
Stenolophus longicollis Erichson, 1847
Stenolophus megacephalus Lindroth, 1968
Stenolophus mexicanus Bates, 1882
Stenolophus mixtus (Herbst, 1784)
Stenolophus nigridius Andrewes, 1947
Stenolophus ochropezus (Say, 1823)
Stenolophus opaculus Bates, 1886
Stenolophus paulinoi Heyden, 1891
Stenolophus persimilis N.Ito, 2000
Stenolophus plagiatus Gorham, 1901
Stenolophus plebejus Dejean, 1829
Stenolophus polygenus Bates, 1886
Stenolophus propinquus A.Morawitz, 1862
Stenolophus proximus Dejean, 1829
Stenolophus quadratus N.Ito, 2000
Stenolophus quadriseriatus Schuler, 1970
Stenolophus sinensis Tschitscherine, 1897
Stenolophus skrimshiranus Stephens, 1828
Stenolophus splendidulus Motschulsky, 1864
Stenolophus spretus Dejean, 1831
Stenolophus steveni Krynicki, 1832
Stenolophus szetschuanus (Jedlicka, 1935)
Stenolophus taoi Kasahara, 1989
Stenolophus teutonus (Schrank, 1781)
Stenolophus trichotichnoides N.Ito, 2000
Stenolophus ussuricus Kataev & Dudko, 1997
Stenolophus volucer Andrewes, 1930

Not assigned to a subgenus
†Stenolophus religatus Scudder, 1900
