= Polpochila =

Scientific classification
- Kingdom: Animalia
- Phylum: Arthropoda
- Class: Insecta
- Order: Coleoptera
- Suborder: Adephaga
- Family: Carabidae
- Tribe: Harpalini
- Subtribe: Stenolophina
- Genus: Polpochila; Solier, 1849

Genus of beetles

Polpochila is a genus of beetles in the family Carabidae, containing the following species:

- Polpochila aguilari Mateu, 2000
- Polpochila angularis Negre, 1967
- Polpochila barbata Negre, 1963
- Polpochila capitata (Chaudoir, 1852)
- Polpochila chilensis (Chaudoir, 1837)
- Polpochila darlingtoni Negre, 1963
- Polpochila erro (Leconte, 1854)
- Polpochila flavipes (Dejean, 1831)
- Polpochila hendrichsi Negre, 1967
- Polpochila impressifrons (Dejean, 1831)
- Polpochila marginalis Negre, 1963
- Polpochila minuta Negre, 1963
- Polpochila monrosi Negre, 1963
- Polpochila nigra (Gory, 1833)
- Polpochila pueli Negre, 1963
- Polpochila reticulata Negre, 1963
- Polpochila rotundicollis Bates, 1882
- Polpochila scaritides (Perty, 1830)
- Polpochila schaumi Negre, 1963
- Polpochila sulcata Negre, 1963
- Polpochila venezolana Negre, 1963
- Polpochila vicina Negre, 1963
- Polpochila willineri Mateu, 2000
