= Philodes flavilimbus =

Scientific classification
- Domain: Eukaryota
- Kingdom: Animalia
- Phylum: Arthropoda
- Class: Insecta
- Order: Coleoptera
- Suborder: Adephaga
- Family: Carabidae
- Subfamily: Harpalinae
- Tribe: Harpalini
- Genus: Philodes
- Species: P. flavilimbus

Binomial name
- Philodes flavilimbus (Le Conte, 1869)

Synonyms
- Acupalpus flavilimbus (Le Conte, 1869)

Species of beetle

Philodes flavilimbus is an insect-eating ground beetle of the Philodes genus. It is found in North America.
