= Philodes alternans =

Scientific classification
- Domain: Eukaryota
- Kingdom: Animalia
- Phylum: Arthropoda
- Class: Insecta
- Order: Coleoptera
- Suborder: Adephaga
- Family: Carabidae
- Subfamily: Harpalinae
- Tribe: Harpalini
- Genus: Philodes
- Species: P. alternans

Binomial name
- Philodes alternans (LeConte, 1853)

Synonyms
- Acupalpus alternans (Leconte, 1853)

Species of beetle

Philodes alternans is a species of ground beetle in the family Carabidae. It is found in North America.
