= Pogonodaptus =

Scientific classification
- Kingdom: Animalia
- Phylum: Arthropoda
- Class: Insecta
- Order: Coleoptera
- Suborder: Adephaga
- Family: Carabidae
- Tribe: Harpalini
- Subtribe: Stenolophina
- Genus: Pogonodaptus; Horn, 1881

Genus of beetles

Pogonodaptus is a genus of beetles in the family Carabidae, containing the following species:

- Pogonodaptus mexicanus (Bates, 1878)
- Pogonodaptus rostratus Darlington, 1935
