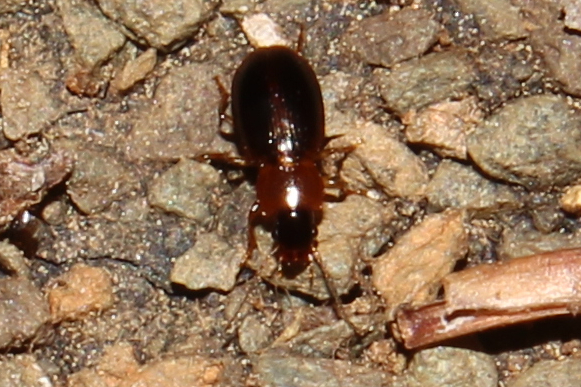

Scientific classification
- Kingdom: Animalia
- Phylum: Arthropoda
- Class: Insecta
- Order: Coleoptera
- Suborder: Adephaga
- Family: Carabidae
- Subtribe: Stenolophina
- Genus: Agonoleptus; Casey, 1914

= Agonoleptus =

Genus of beetles

Agonoleptus is a genus of ground beetles in the family Carabidae. There are about eight described species in Agonoleptus.

== Species ==
These eight species belong to the genus Agonoleptus:

- Agonoleptus conjunctus (Say, 1823)
- Agonoleptus convexulus (Darlington, 1934)
- Agonoleptus dolosus (Casey, 1914)
- Agonoleptus parviceps Casey, 1914
- Agonoleptus rotundatus (LeConte, 1863)
- Agonoleptus rotundicollis (Haldeman, 1843)
- Agonoleptus thoracicus (Casey, 1914)
- Agonoleptus unicolor (Dejean, 1829)
