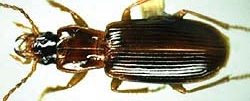

Scientific classification
- Kingdom: Animalia
- Phylum: Arthropoda
- Class: Insecta
- Order: Coleoptera
- Suborder: Adephaga
- Family: Carabidae
- Subfamily: Harpalinae
- Genus: Amerinus; Casey, 1884
- Species: A. linearis

Binomial name
- Amerinus linearis (LeConte, 1863)

= Amerinus =

Amerinus linearis

Genus of beetles

Amerinus linearis is a species of beetle in the family Carabidae, the only species in the genus Amerinus.
