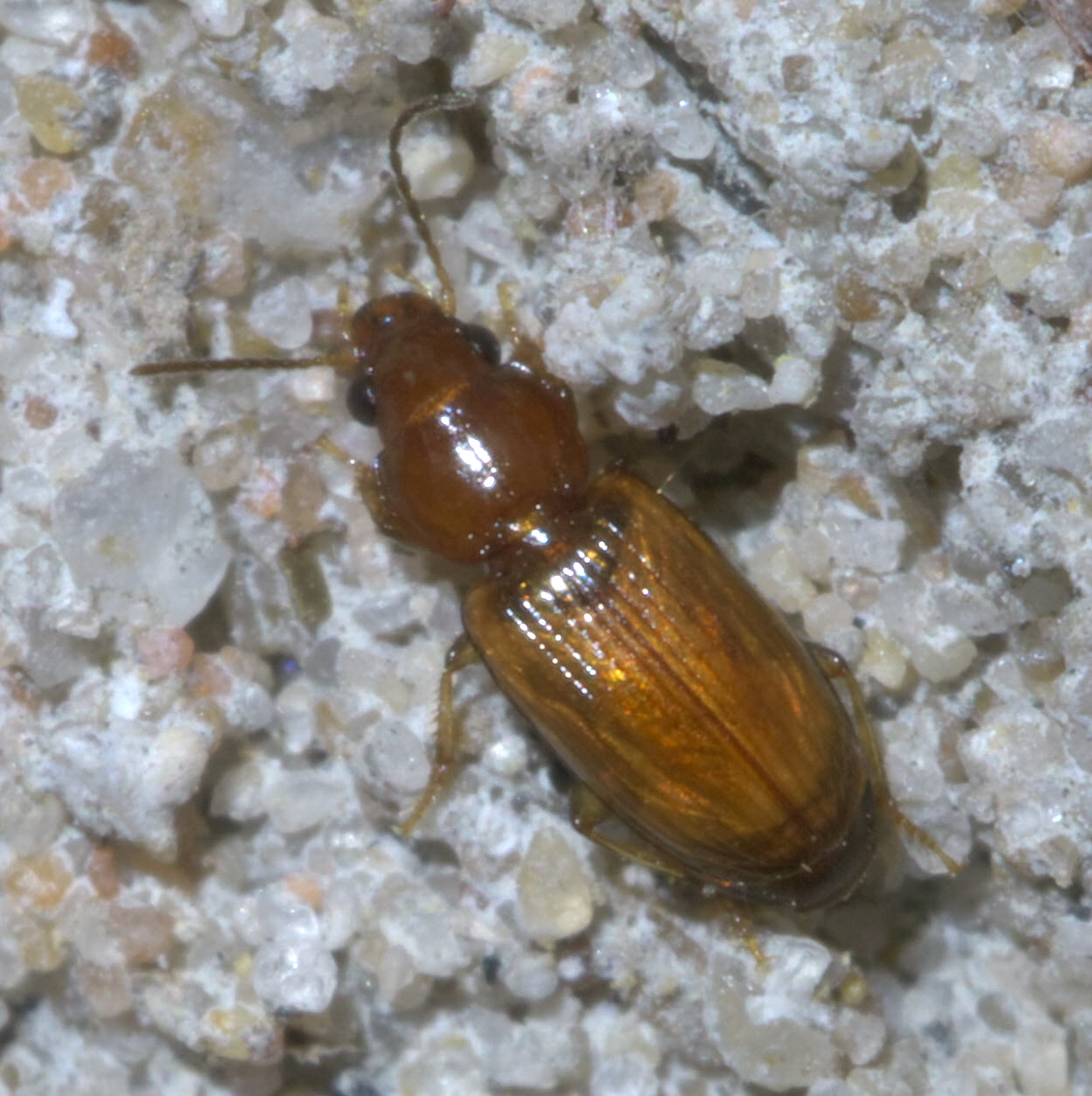
- Acupalpus

Scientific classification
- Domain: Eukaryota
- Kingdom: Animalia
- Phylum: Arthropoda
- Class: Insecta
- Order: Coleoptera
- Suborder: Adephaga
- Family: Carabidae
- Subfamily: Harpalinae
- Tribe: Harpalini
- Subtribe: Stenolophina; Kirkby, 1837

= Stenolophina =

Subtribe of beetles

Stenolophina is a subtribe of ground beetles in the family Carabidae. There are about 9 genera and at least 50 described species in Stenolophina.

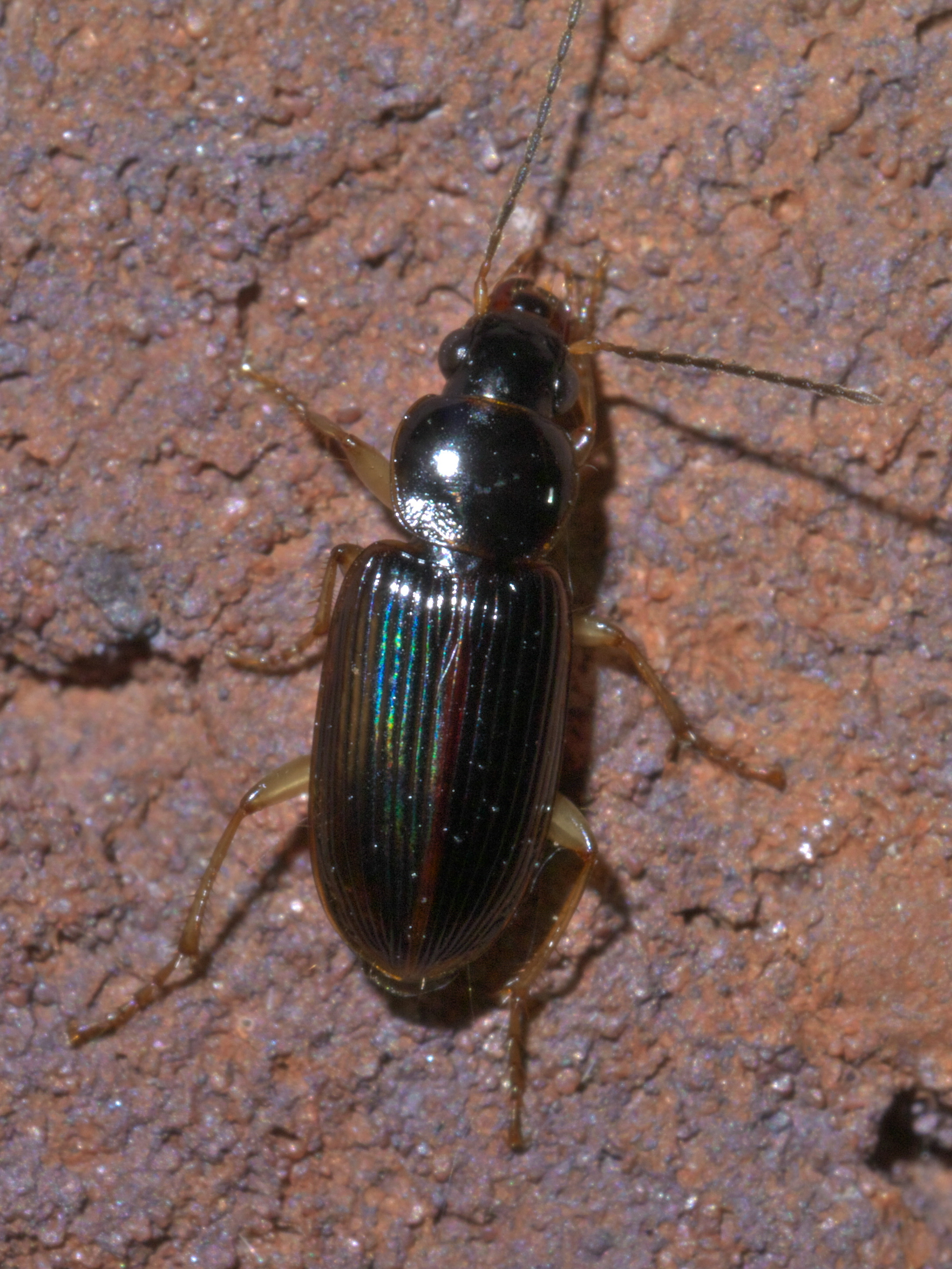
Stenolophus ochropezus

== Genera ==
These nine genera belong to the subtribe Stenolophina:

- Acupalpus Latreille, 1829^{i c g b}
- Agonoleptus Casey, 1914^{i c g b}
- Amerinus Casey, 1884^{i c g b}
- Bradycellus Erichson, 1837^{i c g b}
- Dicheirotrichus Jacquelin du Val, 1855^{i c g b}
- Philodes LeConte, 1861^{i c g b}
- Pogonodaptus G. Horn, 1881^{i c g b}
- Polpochila Solier, 1849^{i c g b}
- Stenolophus Dejean, 1821^{i c g b} (seedcorn beetles)

Data sources: i = ITIS, c = Catalogue of Life, g = GBIF, b = Bugguide.net
