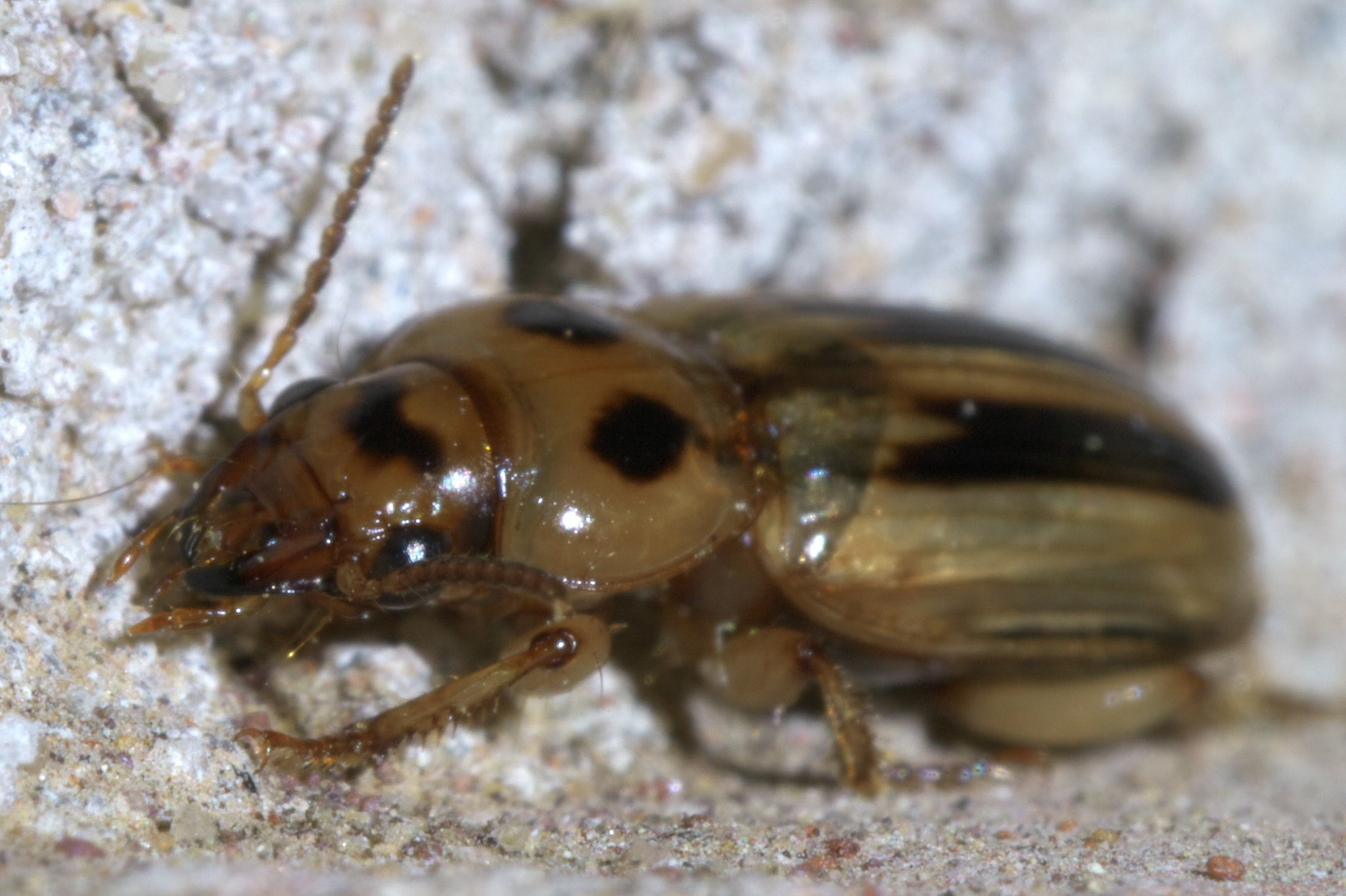
- Stenolophus lineola, Oklahoma

Scientific classification
- Kingdom: Animalia
- Phylum: Arthropoda
- Class: Insecta
- Order: Coleoptera
- Suborder: Adephaga
- Family: Carabidae
- Subfamily: Harpalinae
- Tribe: Stenolophini; Kirby, 1837

= Stenolophini =

Tribe of beetles

Stenolophini is a tribe of ground beetles in the family Carabidae. There are more than 30 genera and 690 described species in Stenolophini.

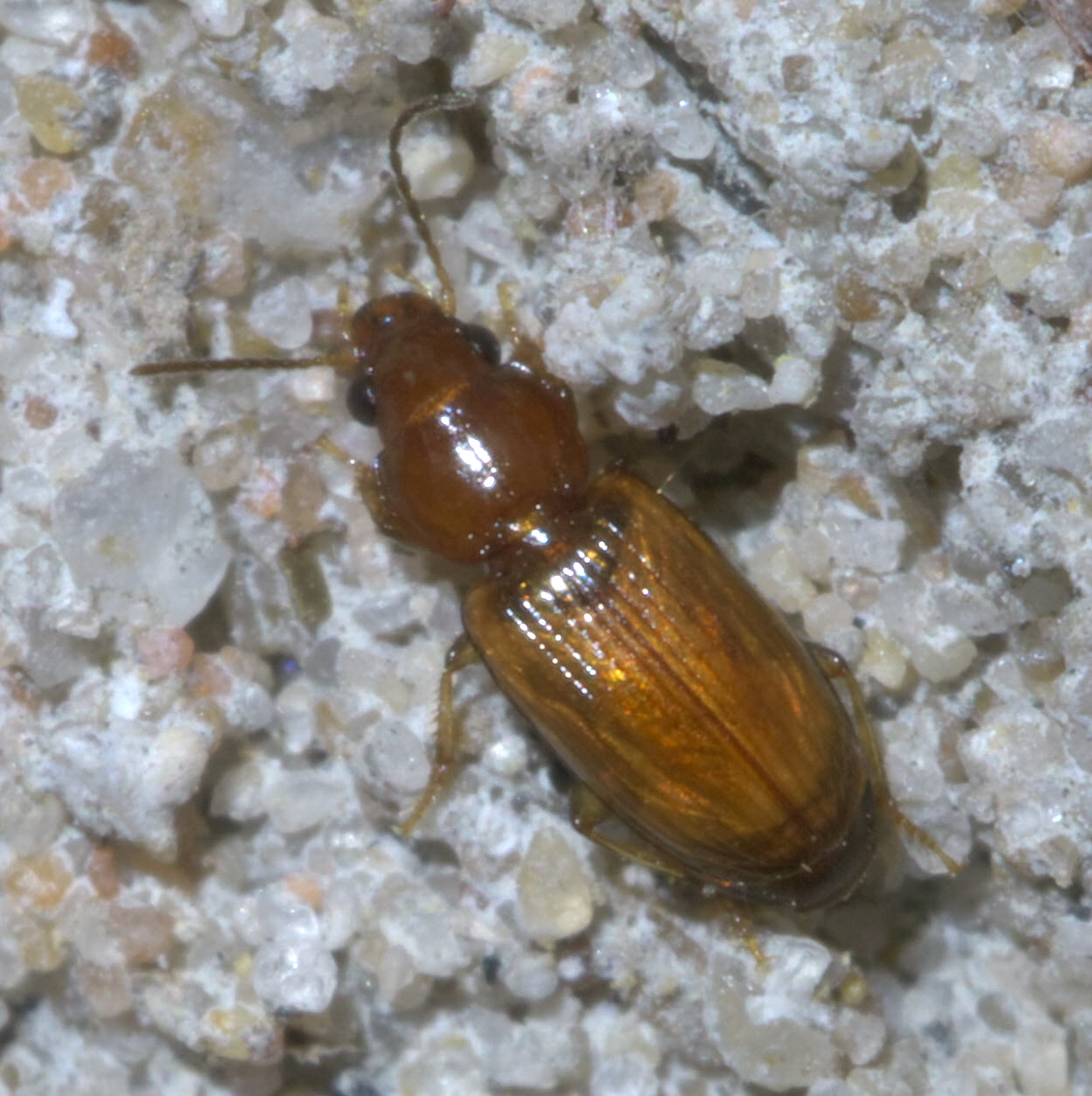
Acupalpus

== Genera ==
These 35 genera belong to the tribe Stenolophini:

- Acupalpus Latreille, 1829
- Agonoleptus Casey, 1914
- Amerinus Casey, 1884
- Angionychus Klug, 1853
- Anthracus Motschulsky, 1850
- Batoscelis Dejean, 1836
- Bradycellus Erichson, 1837
- Cratosoma Jeannel, 1948
- Cyptomicrus Vinson, 1939
- Dicheirotrichus Jacquelin du Val, 1855
- Egadyla Alluaud, 1916
- Euthenarus Bates, 1874
- Fuminoria Morita, 2006
- Goniocellus Casey, 1914
- Gugheorites Basilewsky, 1951
- Haplanister B.Moore, 1996
- Hemiaulax Bates, 1892
- Hippoloetis Laporte, 1835
- Idiomelas Tschitscherine, 1900
- Kaffovatus Clarke, 1972
- Kenyacus Alluaud, 1917
- Kiwiharpalus Larochelle & Larivière, 2005
- Lioholus Tschitscherine, 1897
- Loxoncus Schmidt-Goebel, 1846
- Pachytrachelus Chaudoir, 1852
- Parabradycellus N.Ito, 2003
- Paramecus Dejean, 1829
- Philodes LeConte, 1861
- Pholeodytes Britton, 1962
- Pogonodaptus G.Horn, 1881
- Polpochila Solier, 1849
- Psychristus Andrewes, 1930
- Rhabidius Basilewsky, 1948
- Stenolophus Dejean, 1821
- Uenanthracus Kasahara, 1994
