= A. haemorrhous =

A. haemorrhous may refer to:

- Abacetus haemorrhous, a ground beetle
- Anthracus haemorrhous, a ground beetle found in Indonesia
  - Acupalpus haemorrhous, a synonym of Anthracus haemorrhous
