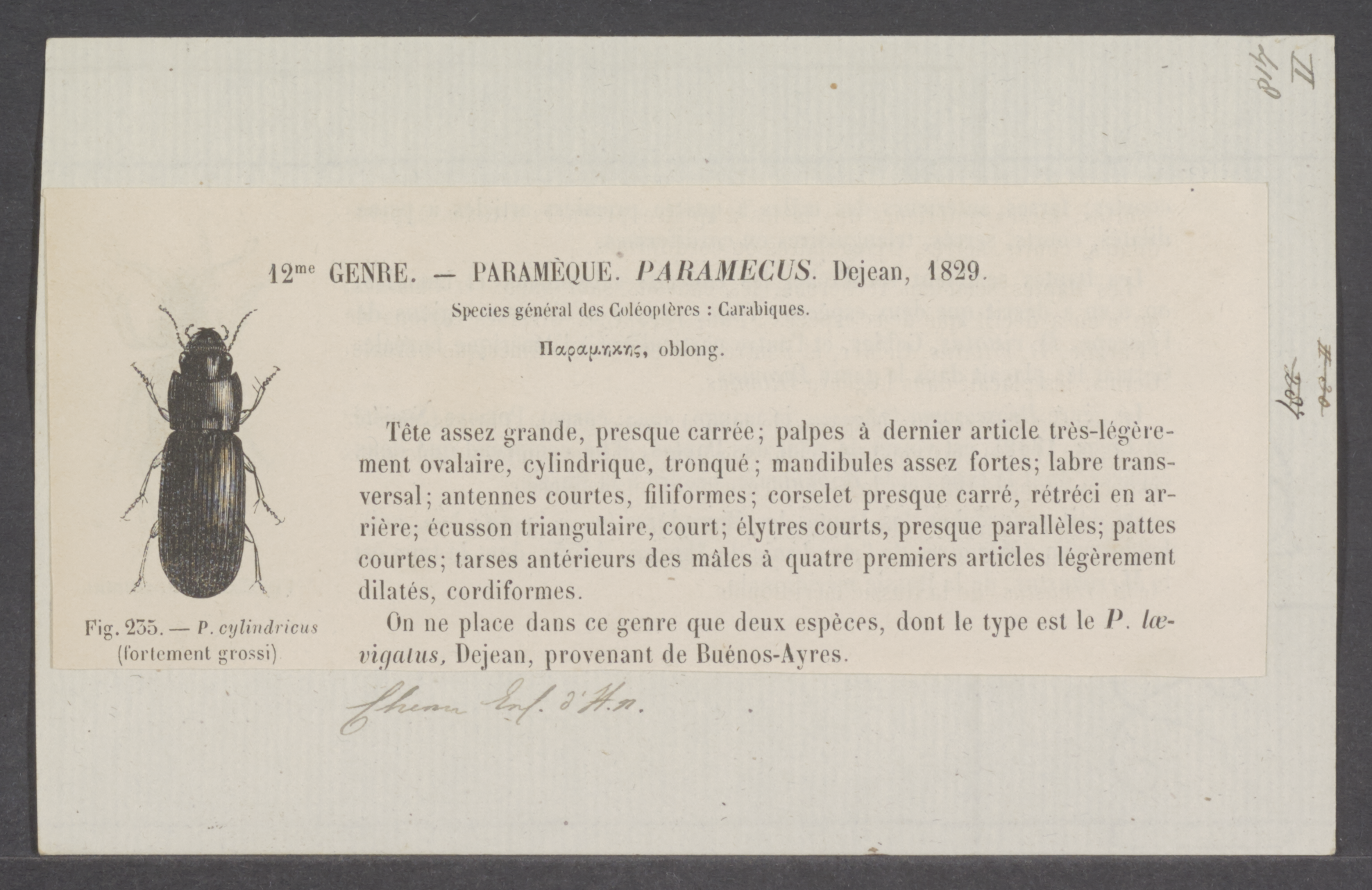
- A print showing the Paramecus

Scientific classification
- Kingdom: Animalia
- Phylum: Arthropoda
- Class: Insecta
- Order: Coleoptera
- Suborder: Adephaga
- Family: Carabidae
- Subfamily: Harpalinae
- Tribe: Stenolophini
- Genus: Paramecus; Dejean, 1829

Synonyms
- Cylloscelis Curtis, 1839

= Paramecus =

Genus of beetles

Paramecus is a genus in the ground beetle family Carabidae. There are at least four described species in Paramecus.

== Species ==
These four species belong to the genus Paramecus:

- Paramecus breviusculus Fairmaire, 1884 (Argentina)
- Paramecus cylindricus Dejean, 1829 (Argentina)
- Paramecus ellipticus (Curtis, 1839) (Argentina)
- Paramecus laevigatus Dejean, 1829 (Chile, Argentina)
