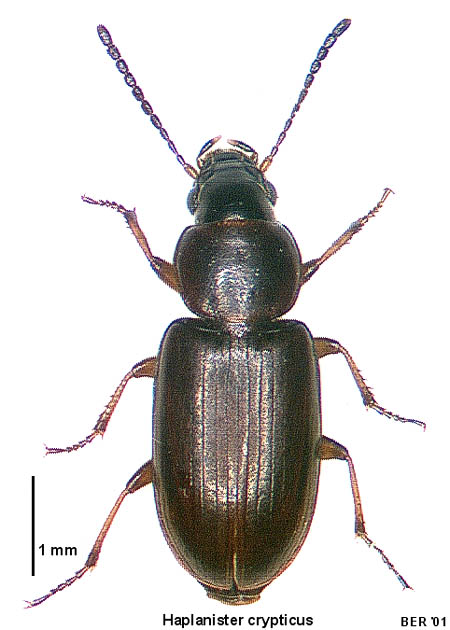
- Haplanister crypticus, New Zealand

Scientific classification
- Domain: Eukaryota
- Kingdom: Animalia
- Phylum: Arthropoda
- Class: Insecta
- Order: Coleoptera
- Suborder: Adephaga
- Family: Carabidae
- Subfamily: Harpalinae
- Tribe: Stenolophini
- Genus: Haplanister; B.Moore, 1996
- Species: H. crypticus

Binomial name
- Haplanister crypticus B.Moore, 1996

= Haplanister =

Species of beetle

Haplanister is a genus of carabids in the beetle family Carabidae. This genus has a single species, Haplanister crypticus, found in New Zealand.
