= Bradycellus festinans =

Scientific classification
- Kingdom: Animalia
- Phylum: Arthropoda
- Clade: Pancrustacea
- Class: Insecta
- Order: Coleoptera
- Suborder: Adephaga
- Family: Carabidae
- Genus: Bradycellus
- Species: B. festinans

Binomial name
- Bradycellus festinans (Casey, 1914)

Species of beetle

Bradycellus festinans is a species of ground beetle in the family Carabidae. It is found in North America. The bug is attracted to light using it (the Moon) to navigate. Their average size is around five millimeter.
