= Bradycellus lugubris =

Scientific classification
- Kingdom: Animalia
- Phylum: Arthropoda
- Class: Insecta
- Order: Coleoptera
- Suborder: Adephaga
- Family: Carabidae
- Genus: Bradycellus
- Species: B. lugubris

Binomial name
- Bradycellus lugubris (LeConte, 1847)

Synonyms
- Bradycellus frosti (Fall, 1930)

Species of beetle

Bradycellus lugubris is a species of ground beetle in the family Carabidae. It is found in North America.
