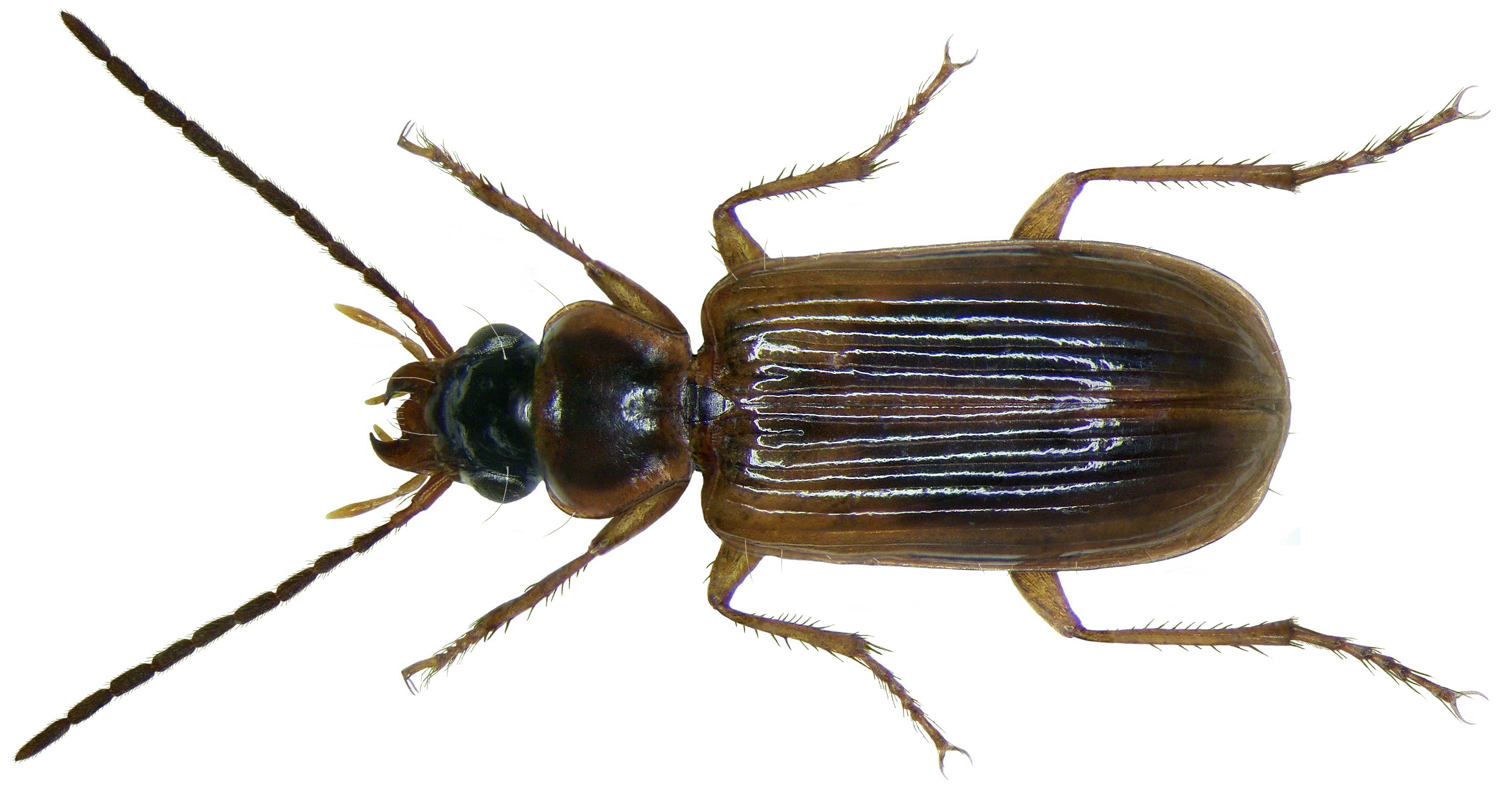
- Anthracus consputus

Scientific classification
- Kingdom: Animalia
- Phylum: Arthropoda
- Class: Insecta
- Order: Coleoptera
- Suborder: Adephaga
- Family: Carabidae
- Tribe: Stenolophini
- Genus: Anthracus; Motschulsky, 1850

= Anthracus =

Genus of beetles

Anthracus is a genus of beetles in the family Carabidae.

== Species ==
These 51 species belong to the genus Anthracus:

- Anthracus angusticollis (Péringuey, 1908)
- Anthracus anichtchenkoi Jaeger, 2015
- Anthracus annamensis (Bates, 1889)
- Anthracus baehri Jaeger, 2016
- Anthracus basanicus J.Sahlberg, 1908
- Anthracus biplagiatus (Boheman, 1858)
- Anthracus brevipennis Jaeger, 2017
- Anthracus consputus (Duftschmid, 1812)
- Anthracus cordiger Basilewsky, 1951
- Anthracus currilis Normand, 1941
- Anthracus darlingtoni Jaeger, 2017
- Anthracus decellei Basilewsky, 1968
- Anthracus derogatus (Walker, 1858)
- Anthracus drurei (Pic, 1904)
- Anthracus exactellus (Darlington, 1968)
- Anthracus exactus (Darlington, 1968)
- Anthracus flavipennis (Lucas, 1846)
- Anthracus fonticola Normand, 1938
- Anthracus franzi Basilewsky, 1961
- Anthracus fritzhiekei Jaeger, 2016
- Anthracus furvinus (Darlington, 1968)
- Anthracus furvus (Andrewes, 1947)
- Anthracus glabrus (Louwerens, 1952)
- Anthracus haemorrhous (Louwerens, 1952)
- Anthracus hauseri A.Fleischer, 1914
- Anthracus hornburgi Jaeger, 2015
- Anthracus horni (Andrewes, 1923)
- Anthracus indicus Jaeger, 2012
- Anthracus insignis Reitter, 1884
- Anthracus javaensis Jaeger, 2015
- Anthracus latus Jaeger, 2012
- Anthracus leyteensis Jaeger, 2017
- Anthracus longicornis (Schaum, 1857)
- Anthracus madecassus Jeannel, 1948
- Anthracus mindanaoensis Jaeger, 2017
- Anthracus nathani Jaeger, 2017
- Anthracus nesophilus (Andrewes, 1936)
- Anthracus novaecaledonicus Jaeger, 2016
- Anthracus overlaeti (Burgeon, 1936)
- Anthracus pallidus Basilewsky, 1951
- Anthracus philippinensis Jaeger, 2015
- Anthracus punctulatus (Hatch, 1953)
- Anthracus quarnerensis (Reitter, 1884)
- Anthracus schuhi Jaeger, 2012
- Anthracus siamensis Jaeger, 2015
- Anthracus skalei Jaeger, 2015
- Anthracus sumatraensis Jaeger, 2015
- Anthracus tener (LeConte, 1857)
- Anthracus transversalis (Schaum, 1862)
- Anthracus vanharteni Jaeger & Felix in Felix, 2009
- Anthracus weigeli Jaeger, 2015
- Anthracus wrasei Jaeger, 2012
