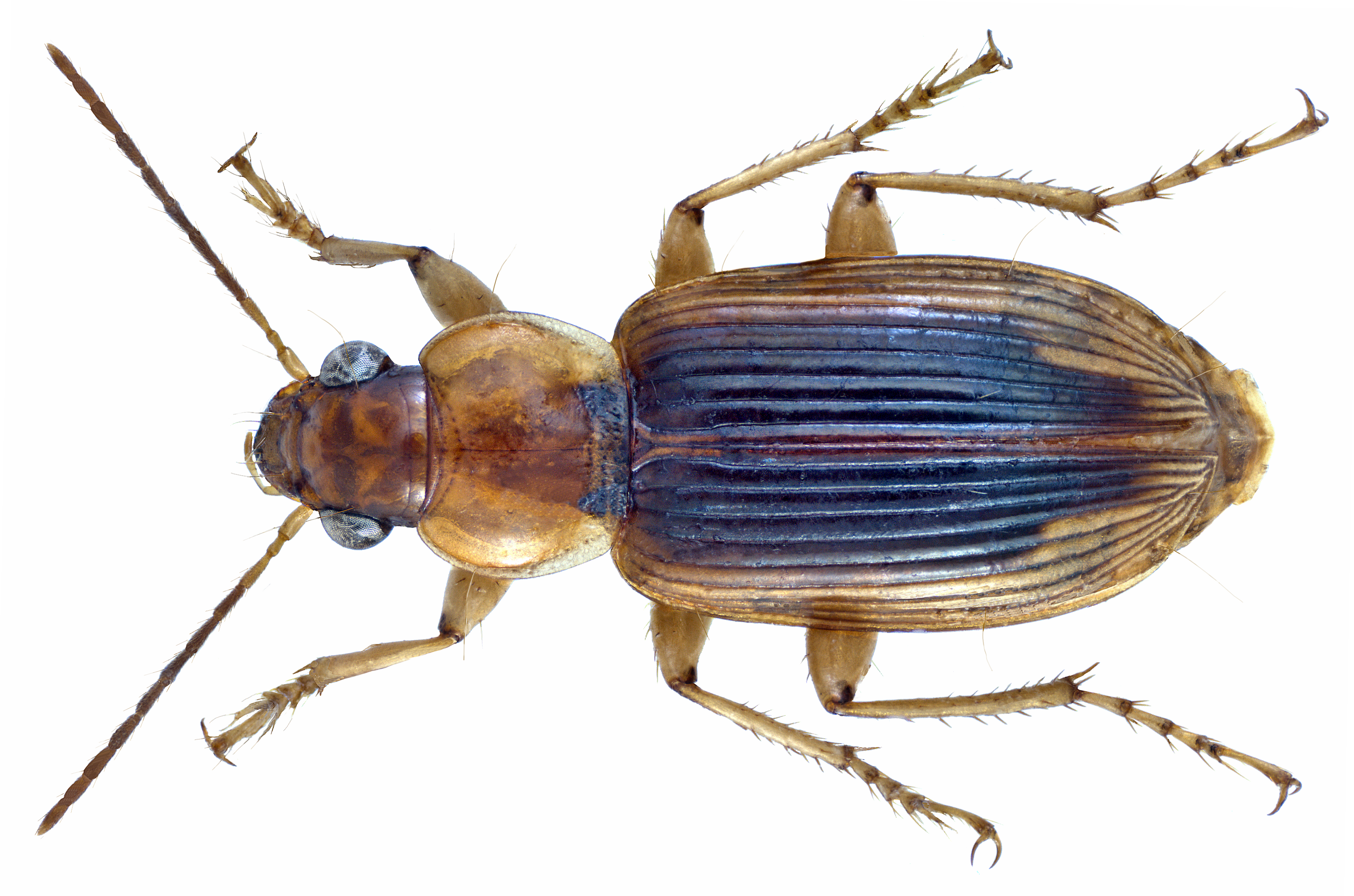
- Loxoncus alacer

Scientific classification
- Kingdom: Animalia
- Phylum: Arthropoda
- Class: Insecta
- Order: Coleoptera
- Suborder: Adephaga
- Family: Carabidae
- Subfamily: Harpalinae
- Tribe: Stenolophini
- Genus: Loxoncus; Schmidt-Goebel, 1846

Subgenera
- Loxoncus Schmidt-Goebel, 1846; Xoloncus Kataev, 2003

= Loxoncus =

Genus of beetles

Loxoncus is a genus in the beetle family Carabidae. There are more than 30 described species in Loxoncus.

== Species ==
These 36 species belong to the genus Loxoncus:

- Loxoncus agilis (Péringuey, 1896)
- Loxoncus agyzimbanus (Fairmaire, 1869)
- Loxoncus alacer (Dejean, 1831)
- Loxoncus amoenulus (Péringuey, 1896)
- Loxoncus ampandrandavae (Basilewsky, 1977)
- Loxoncus arrowi (Jedlicka, 1935)
- Loxoncus basilewskyi (Lecordier, 1978)
- Loxoncus circumcinctus (Motschulsky, 1858)
- Loxoncus coliensis A.Serrano, 1999
- Loxoncus discophorus (Chaudoir, 1852)
- Loxoncus elevatus Schmidt-Goebel, 1846
- Loxoncus gynuis Kataev, 2003
- Loxoncus hiekei Kataev, 2003
- Loxoncus horni (Schauberger, 1938)
- Loxoncus incisus (Andrewes, 1926)
- Loxoncus madagascariensis (Alluaud, 1917)
- Loxoncus malaisei Kataev, 2003
- Loxoncus marginatus (W.J.MacLeay, 1888)
- Loxoncus microgonus (Bates, 1886)
- Loxoncus mitis (LaFerté-Sénectère, 1853)
- Loxoncus mocquerysi (Alluaud, 1917)
- Loxoncus nagpurensis (Bates, 1891)
- Loxoncus planicollis (Bates, 1892)
- Loxoncus politus (Schauberger, 1937)
- Loxoncus procerus (Schaum, 1858)
- Loxoncus renitens (Bates, 1886)
- Loxoncus rutilans (Bates, 1889)
- Loxoncus schmidti Kataev, 2003
- Loxoncus schuelei Facchini, 2019
- Loxoncus seyrigi (Alluaud, 1936)
- Loxoncus sicardi (Jeannel, 1948)
- Loxoncus similatus Facchini, 2019
- Loxoncus snizeki Facchini, 2015
- Loxoncus subagilis (Basilewsky, 1968)
- Loxoncus trochantericus Facchini, 2019
- Loxoncus velox (Dejean, 1829)
