= Bradycellus neglectus =

Scientific classification
- Kingdom: Animalia
- Phylum: Arthropoda
- Class: Insecta
- Order: Coleoptera
- Suborder: Adephaga
- Family: Carabidae
- Genus: Bradycellus
- Species: B. neglectus

Binomial name
- Bradycellus neglectus (LeConte, 1847)

Species of beetle

Bradycellus neglectus is a species of ground beetles in the family Carabidae. It is found in North America.
