= Cyptomicrus =

Scientific classification
- Domain: Eukaryota
- Kingdom: Animalia
- Phylum: Arthropoda
- Class: Insecta
- Order: Coleoptera
- Suborder: Adephaga
- Family: Carabidae
- Subfamily: Harpalinae
- Tribe: Stenolophini
- Genus: Cyptomicrus; Vinson, 1939
- Species: C. pollicis

Binomial name
- Cyptomicrus pollicis Vinson, 1939

Species of beetle

Cyptomicrus is a genus in the ground beetle family Carabidae. This genus has a single species, Cyptomicrus pollicis. It is found in Mauritius.
