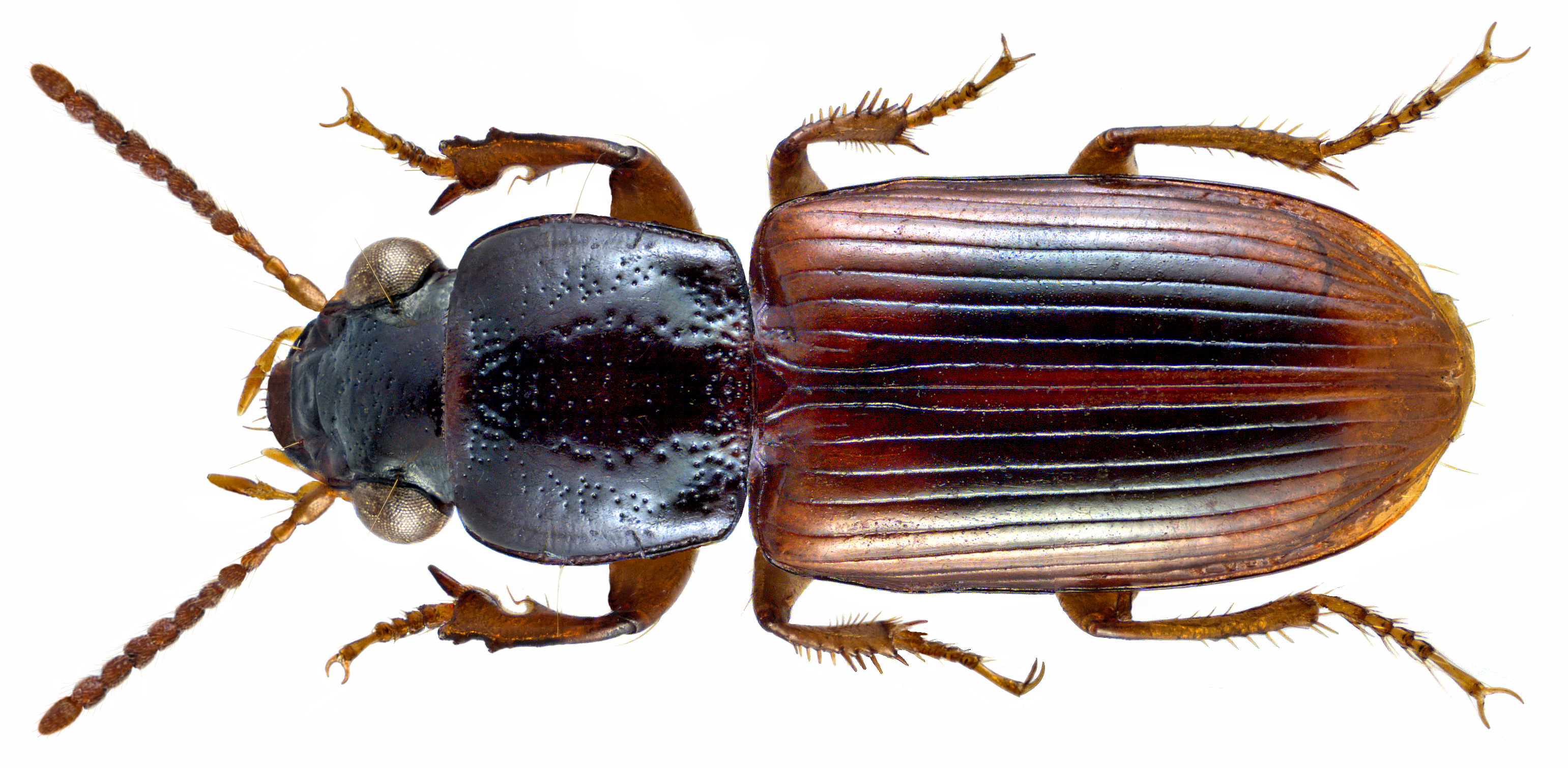
- Batoscelis discipennis

Scientific classification
- Kingdom: Animalia
- Phylum: Arthropoda
- Class: Insecta
- Order: Coleoptera
- Suborder: Adephaga
- Family: Carabidae
- Subfamily: Harpalinae
- Tribe: Stenolophini
- Genus: Batoscelis; Dejean, 1836

= Batoscelis =

Genus of beetles

Batoscelis is a genus in the beetle family Carabidae. There are about 12 described species in Batoscelis.

== Species ==
These 12 species belong to the genus Batoscelis:

- Batoscelis clivinoides (Alluaud, 1897) (Madagascar)
- Batoscelis discipennis (Dejean, 1831) (Africa)
- Batoscelis gerardi (Burgeon, 1936) (Africa)
- Batoscelis hellmichi (Jedlicka, 1965) (Nepal)
- Batoscelis leontovitchi Basilewsky, 1951 (Democratic Republic of the Congo)
- Batoscelis luctuosa (Péringuey, 1896) (South Africa)
- Batoscelis luticola (Alluaud, 1897) (Madagascar)
- Batoscelis nigra (Basilewsky, 1946) (South Africa)
- Batoscelis oblonga (Dejean, 1831) (China, Indomalaya, Philippines, Australia)
- Batoscelis perrieri Jeannel, 1948 (Madagascar)
- Batoscelis porosa (Putzeys, 1861) (India)
- Batoscelis promontorii (Péringuey, 1896) (Zimbabwe, South Africa)
