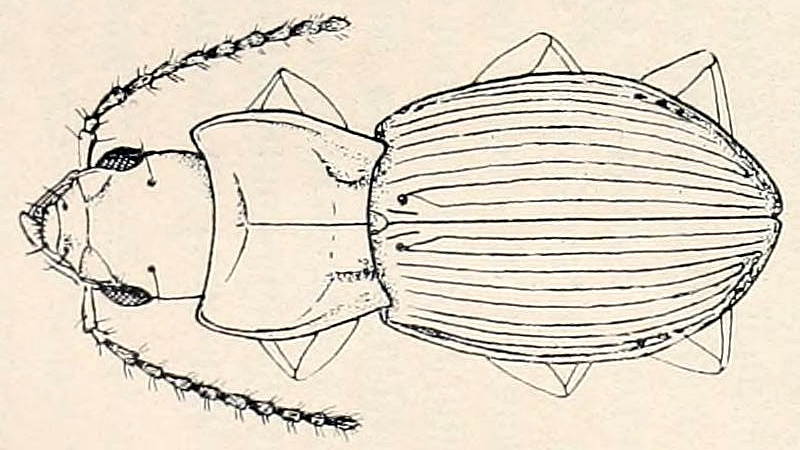

Scientific classification
- Domain: Eukaryota
- Kingdom: Animalia
- Phylum: Arthropoda
- Class: Insecta
- Order: Coleoptera
- Suborder: Adephaga
- Family: Carabidae
- Subfamily: Harpalinae
- Genus: Kenyacus
- Species: K. ruwenzorii

Binomial name
- Kenyacus ruwenzorii (Alluaud, 1917)

Synonyms
- Tropicoritus ruwenzorii Alluaud, 1917

= Kenyacus ruwenzorii =

Species of ground beetle

Kenyacus ruwenzorii is a species of ground beetle in the subfamily Harpalinae first described by Charles Alluaud in 1917.
