= Anthracus derogatus =

Scientific classification
- Kingdom: Animalia
- Phylum: Arthropoda
- Class: Insecta
- Order: Coleoptera
- Suborder: Adephaga
- Family: Carabidae
- Genus: Anthracus
- Species: A. derogatus

Binomial name
- Anthracus derogatus (Walker, 1858)

Synonyms
- Acupalpus derogatus Walker, 1858

Species of beetle

Anthracus derogatus is an insect-eating ground beetle of the genus Anthracus. It was discovered in Sri Lanka.
