= Cratosoma =

Scientific classification
- Kingdom: Animalia
- Phylum: Arthropoda
- Class: Insecta
- Order: Coleoptera
- Suborder: Adephaga
- Family: Carabidae
- Subfamily: Harpalinae
- Tribe: Stenolophini
- Genus: Cratosoma; Jeannel, 1948
- Species: C. pictum

Binomial name
- Cratosoma pictum (Fairmaire, 1903)

Species of beetle

Cratosoma is a genus in the ground beetle family Carabidae. This genus has a single species, Cratosoma pictum. It is found in Madagascar.
