= Psychristus belkab =

Scientific classification
- Kingdom: Animalia
- Phylum: Arthropoda
- Class: Insecta
- Order: Coleoptera
- Suborder: Adephaga
- Family: Carabidae
- Genus: Psychristus
- Species: P. belkab

Binomial name
- Psychristus belkab Wrase & Kataev, 2009

Species of beetle

Psychristus belkab is a species of ground beetle from the Harpalinae subfamily that is endemic to Yunnan province of China.
