= Psychristus =

Scientific classification
- Kingdom: Animalia
- Phylum: Arthropoda
- Class: Insecta
- Order: Coleoptera
- Suborder: Adephaga
- Family: Carabidae
- Subfamily: Harpalinae
- Tribe: Stenolophini
- Genus: Psychristus; Andrewes, 1930

Subgenera
- Nipponobradycellus Habu, 1973; Psychristus Andrewes, 1930

Synonyms
- Nipponobradycellus Habu, 1973; Psychistrus Andrewes, 1930; Taiwanobradycellus Ito, 1985

Genus of beetles

Psychristus is a genus in the ground beetle family Carabidae. There are more than 20 described species in Psychristus, found in south, southeast, and east Asia.

== Species ==
These 21 species belong to the genus Psychristus:

- Psychristus accessor Wrase, 1997 (China)
- Psychristus amicorum Jaeger, 1997 (Nepal, Bhutan, India)
- Psychristus andrewesi Jaeger, 1997 (Nepal, Bhutan, India)
- Psychristus belkab Wrase & Kataev, 2009 (China)
- Psychristus brunneus Jaeger, 2009 (Pakistan, India, Thailand, Laos, Indonesia)
- Psychristus consimilis Jaeger, 1997 (Nepal, India)
- Psychristus cooteri Wrase & Kataev, 2009 (China)
- Psychristus curvus Wrase, 1997 (China)
- Psychristus dentatus Jaeger, 2009 (China)
- Psychristus discretus Andrewes, 1930 (China, Nepal, Bhutan, India, Vietnam)
- Psychristus glaber Jaeger & Wrase, 2007 (Nepal)
- Psychristus hubeicus Wrase & Kataev, 2009 (China)
- Psychristus lewisi (Schauberger, 1933) (China, Japan)
- Psychristus liparops Andrewes, 1930 (China, Nepal, India)
- Psychristus longyangensis Wrase & Kataev, 2009 (China)
- Psychristus magnus Wrase & Kataev, 2009 (China)
- Psychristus schmidti Jaeger & Wrase, 2007 (Nepal)
- Psychristus schuelkei Wrase & Kataev, 2009 (China)
- Psychristus shibatai (N.Ito, 1985) (Taiwan, India)
- Psychristus sichuanensis Wrase & Jaeger, 1995 (China)
- Psychristus umbraticornis Jaeger & Wrase, 2007 (Nepal)
