= Hippoloetis =

Scientific classification
- Domain: Eukaryota
- Kingdom: Animalia
- Phylum: Arthropoda
- Class: Insecta
- Order: Coleoptera
- Suborder: Adephaga
- Family: Carabidae
- Subfamily: Harpalinae
- Tribe: Stenolophini
- Genus: Hippoloetis; Laporte, 1835

Species of beetle

Hippoloetis is a genus in the beetle family Carabidae. There are at least two described species in Hippoloetis.

== Species ==
These two species belong to the genus Hippoloetis:

- Hippoloetis mirei Lemaire, 2019
- Hippoloetis rufus Laporte, 1834 (Africa)
