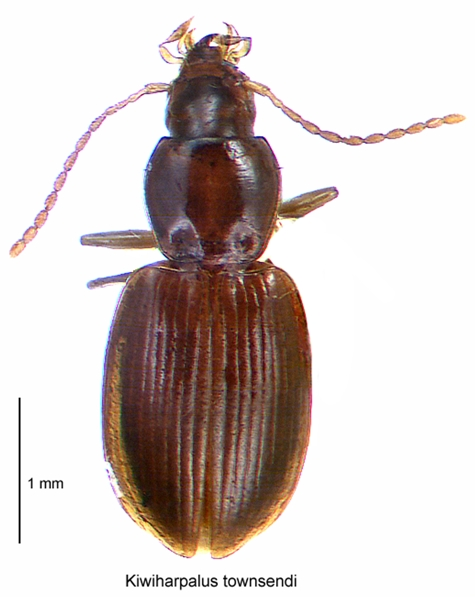

Scientific classification
- Domain: Eukaryota
- Kingdom: Animalia
- Phylum: Arthropoda
- Class: Insecta
- Order: Coleoptera
- Suborder: Adephaga
- Family: Carabidae
- Subfamily: Harpalinae
- Tribe: Stenolophini
- Genus: Kiwiharpalus; Larochelle & Larivière, 2005
- Species: K. townsendi

Binomial name
- Kiwiharpalus townsendi Larochelle & Larivière, 2005

= Kiwiharpalus =

Species of beetle

Kiwiharpalus is a genus in the ground beetle family Carabidae. This genus has a single species, Kiwiharpalus townsendi. It is found in New Zealand.

This species is endemic to New Zealand, being found nowhere else. It was discovered and first recorded in 2005.
