= Lioholus =

Scientific classification
- Domain: Eukaryota
- Kingdom: Animalia
- Phylum: Arthropoda
- Class: Insecta
- Order: Coleoptera
- Suborder: Adephaga
- Family: Carabidae
- Subfamily: Harpalinae
- Tribe: Stenolophini
- Genus: Lioholus; Tschitscherine, 1897

Synonyms
- Liolus Jakobson, 1907

Genus of beetles

Lioholus is a genus in the ground beetle family Carabidae. There are at least two described species in Lioholus.

== Species ==
These two species belong to the genus Lioholus:

- Lioholus jedlickai Lafer, 1989 (China, Korea, Russia)
- Lioholus metallescens Tschitscherine, 1897 (China)
