= Bradycellus nubifer =

Scientific classification
- Domain: Eukaryota
- Kingdom: Animalia
- Phylum: Arthropoda
- Class: Insecta
- Order: Coleoptera
- Suborder: Adephaga
- Family: Carabidae
- Subfamily: Harpalinae
- Tribe: Harpalini
- Genus: Bradycellus
- Species: B. nubifer

Binomial name
- Bradycellus nubifer LeConte, 1858

Species of beetle

Bradycellus nubifer is a species of ground beetle in the family Carabidae. It is found in North America.
