= Kaffovatus =

Scientific classification
- Domain: Eukaryota
- Kingdom: Animalia
- Phylum: Arthropoda
- Class: Insecta
- Order: Coleoptera
- Suborder: Adephaga
- Family: Carabidae
- Subfamily: Harpalinae
- Tribe: Stenolophini
- Genus: Kaffovatus; Clarke, 1972
- Species: K. basilewskyi

Binomial name
- Kaffovatus basilewskyi Clarke, 1972

Species of beetle

Kaffovatus is a genus in the ground beetle family Carabidae. This genus has a single species, Kaffovatus basilewskyi. It is found in Ethiopia.
