= Bradycellus lineatus =

Scientific classification
- Kingdom: Animalia
- Phylum: Arthropoda
- Class: Insecta
- Order: Coleoptera
- Suborder: Adephaga
- Family: Carabidae
- Genus: Bradycellus
- Species: B. lineatus

Binomial name
- Bradycellus lineatus (Casey, 1914)

Species of beetle

Bradycellus lineatus is a species of ground beetle in the family Carabidae. It is found in North America.
