= Gugheorites =

Scientific classification
- Domain: Eukaryota
- Kingdom: Animalia
- Phylum: Arthropoda
- Class: Insecta
- Order: Coleoptera
- Suborder: Adephaga
- Family: Carabidae
- Subfamily: Harpalinae
- Tribe: Stenolophini
- Genus: Gugheorites; Basilewsky, 1951
- Species: G. scotti

Binomial name
- Gugheorites scotti Basilewsky, 1951

Genus of beetles

Gugheorites is a genus of carabids in the beetle family Carabidae. This genus has a single species, Gugheorites scotti. It is found in Ethiopia.
