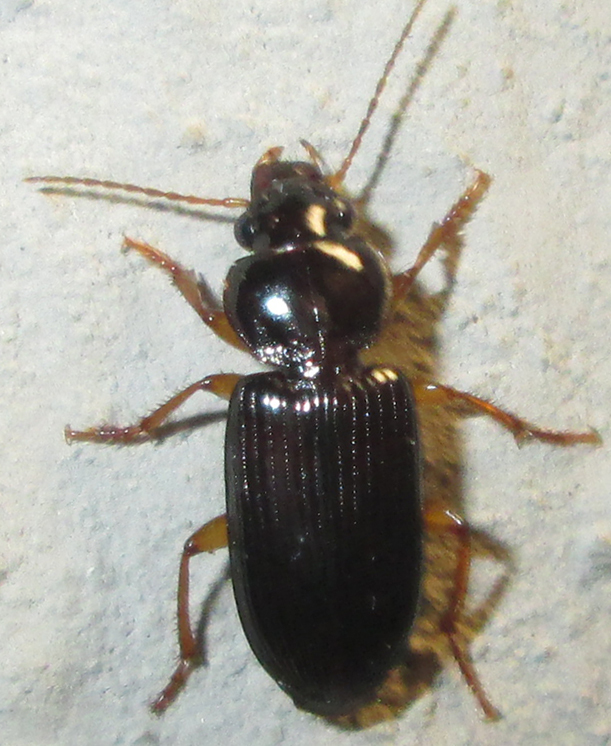
- Idiomelas crenulatus, Botswana

Scientific classification
- Domain: Eukaryota
- Kingdom: Animalia
- Phylum: Arthropoda
- Class: Insecta
- Order: Coleoptera
- Suborder: Adephaga
- Family: Carabidae
- Subfamily: Harpalinae
- Tribe: Stenolophini
- Genus: Idiomelas; Tschitscherine, 1900

Subgenera
- Egaploa Alluaud, 1916; Idiomelas Tschitscherine, 1900

= Idiomelas =

Genus of beetles

Idiomelas is a genus in the ground beetle family Carabidae. There are at least four described species in Idiomelas, found in Africa and Asia.

== Species ==
These four species belong to the genus Idiomelas:

- Idiomelas crenulatus (Dejean, 1829)
- Idiomelas fulvipes (Erichson, 1843)
- Idiomelas morio (Ménétriés, 1832)
- Idiomelas nigripes (Reitter, 1894)
