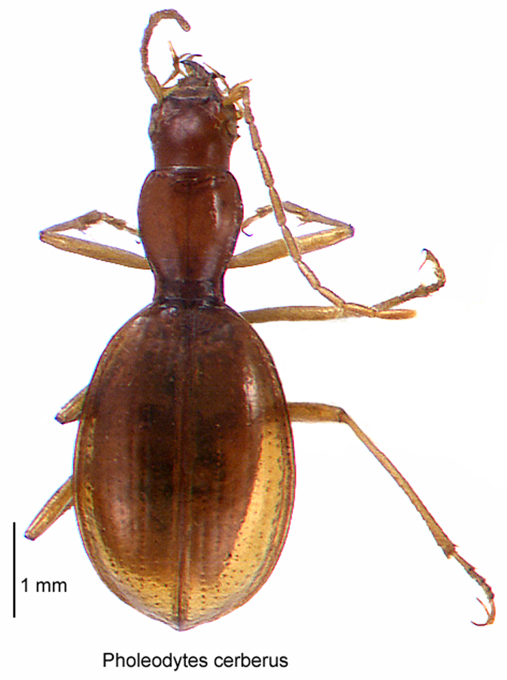
- Pholeodytes cerberus

Scientific classification
- Domain: Eukaryota
- Kingdom: Animalia
- Phylum: Arthropoda
- Class: Insecta
- Order: Coleoptera
- Suborder: Adephaga
- Family: Carabidae
- Subfamily: Harpalinae
- Tribe: Stenolophini
- Genus: Pholeodytes; Britton, 1962

= Pholeodytes =

Genus of beetles

Pholeodytes is a genus in the ground beetle family Carabidae. There are about five described species in Pholeodytes, found in New Zealand.

== Species ==
These five species belong to the genus Pholeodytes:

- Pholeodytes cerberus Britton, 1964
- Pholeodytes helmorei Larochelle & Larivière, 2005
- Pholeodytes nunni Larochelle & Larivière, 2005
- Pholeodytes palmai Larochelle & Larivière, 2005
- Pholeodytes townsendi Britton, 1962
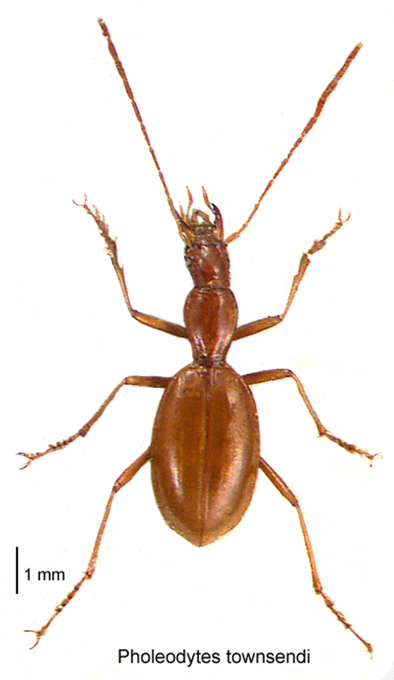
Pholeodytes townsendi

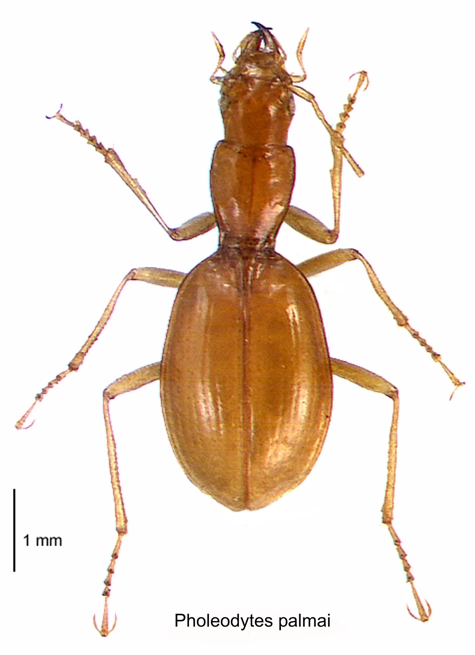
Pholeodytes palmai
