= Pachytrachelus =

Scientific classification
- Domain: Eukaryota
- Kingdom: Animalia
- Phylum: Arthropoda
- Class: Insecta
- Order: Coleoptera
- Suborder: Adephaga
- Family: Carabidae
- Subfamily: Harpalinae
- Tribe: Stenolophini
- Genus: Pachytrachelus; Chaudoir, 1852
- Species: P. cribriceps

Binomial name
- Pachytrachelus cribriceps Chaudoir, 1852

Species of beetle

Pachytrachelus is a genus in the ground beetle family Carabidae. This genus has a single species, Pachytrachelus cribriceps. It is found in Nepal, Bangladesh, and India.
