= Bradycellus nigriceps =

Scientific classification
- Kingdom: Animalia
- Phylum: Arthropoda
- Class: Insecta
- Order: Coleoptera
- Suborder: Adephaga
- Family: Carabidae
- Subfamily: Harpalinae
- Tribe: Harpalini
- Genus: Bradycellus
- Species: B. nigriceps

Binomial name
- Bradycellus nigriceps LeConte, 1869

Species of beetle

Bradycellus nigriceps is a species of ground beetle in the family Carabidae. It is found in North America.
