= Anthracus glabrus =

Scientific classification
- Domain: Eukaryota
- Kingdom: Animalia
- Phylum: Arthropoda
- Class: Insecta
- Order: Coleoptera
- Suborder: Adephaga
- Family: Carabidae
- Subfamily: Harpalinae
- Genus: Anthracus
- Species: A. glabrus

Binomial name
- Anthracus glabrus (Louwerens, 1952)

Synonyms
- Acupalpus glabrus Louwerens, 1952

Species of beetle

Anthracus glabrus is an insect-eating ground beetle of the genus Anthracus. It is found in Indonesia.
