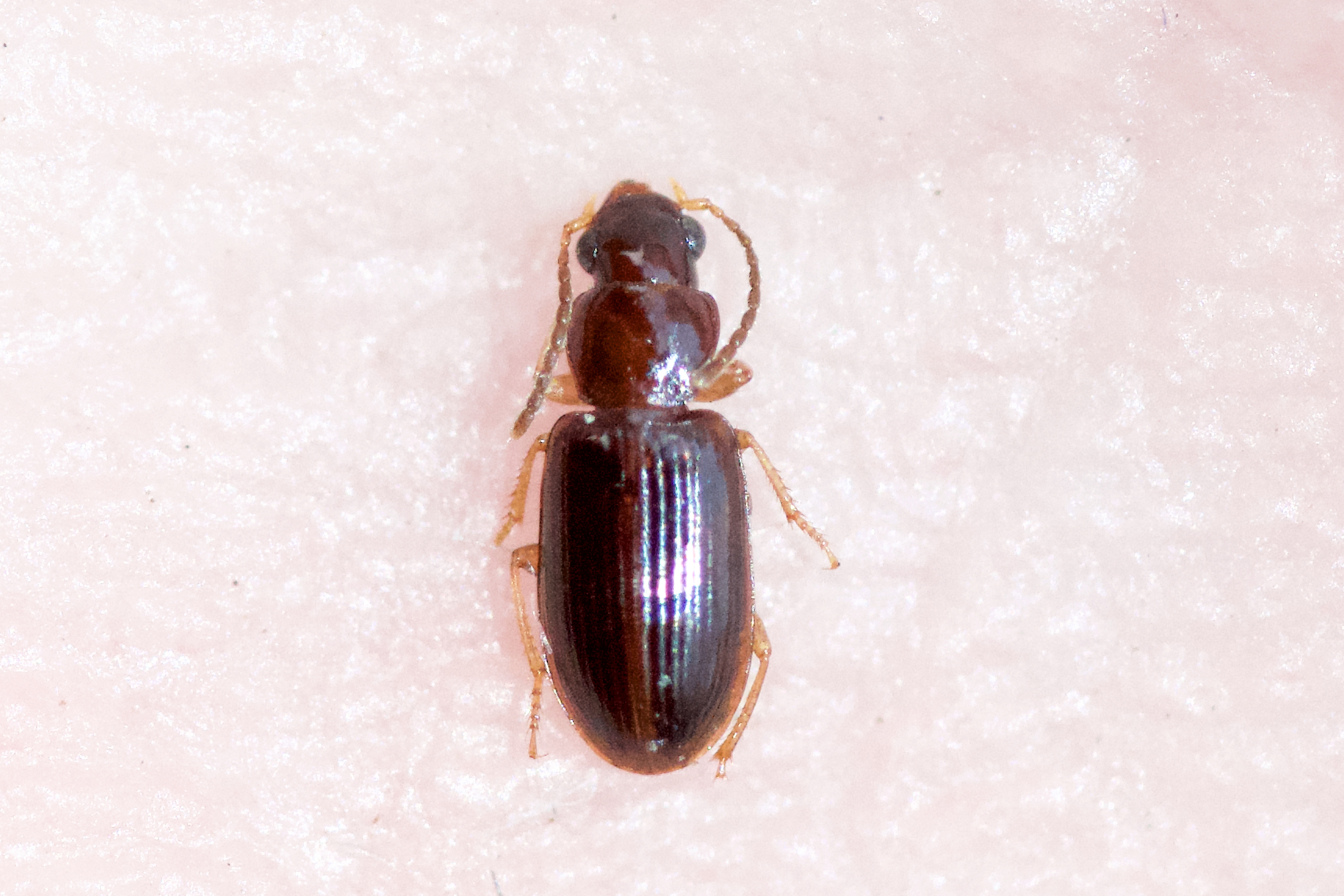
- Bradycellus tantillus, Canada

Scientific classification
- Kingdom: Animalia
- Phylum: Arthropoda
- Class: Insecta
- Order: Coleoptera
- Suborder: Adephaga
- Family: Carabidae
- Tribe: Harpalini
- Genus: Bradycellus
- Species: B. tantillus

Binomial name
- Bradycellus tantillus (Dejean, 1829)

= Bradycellus tantillus =

Species of beetle

Bradycellus tantillus is a species of ground beetle in the family Carabidae. It is found in North America.
