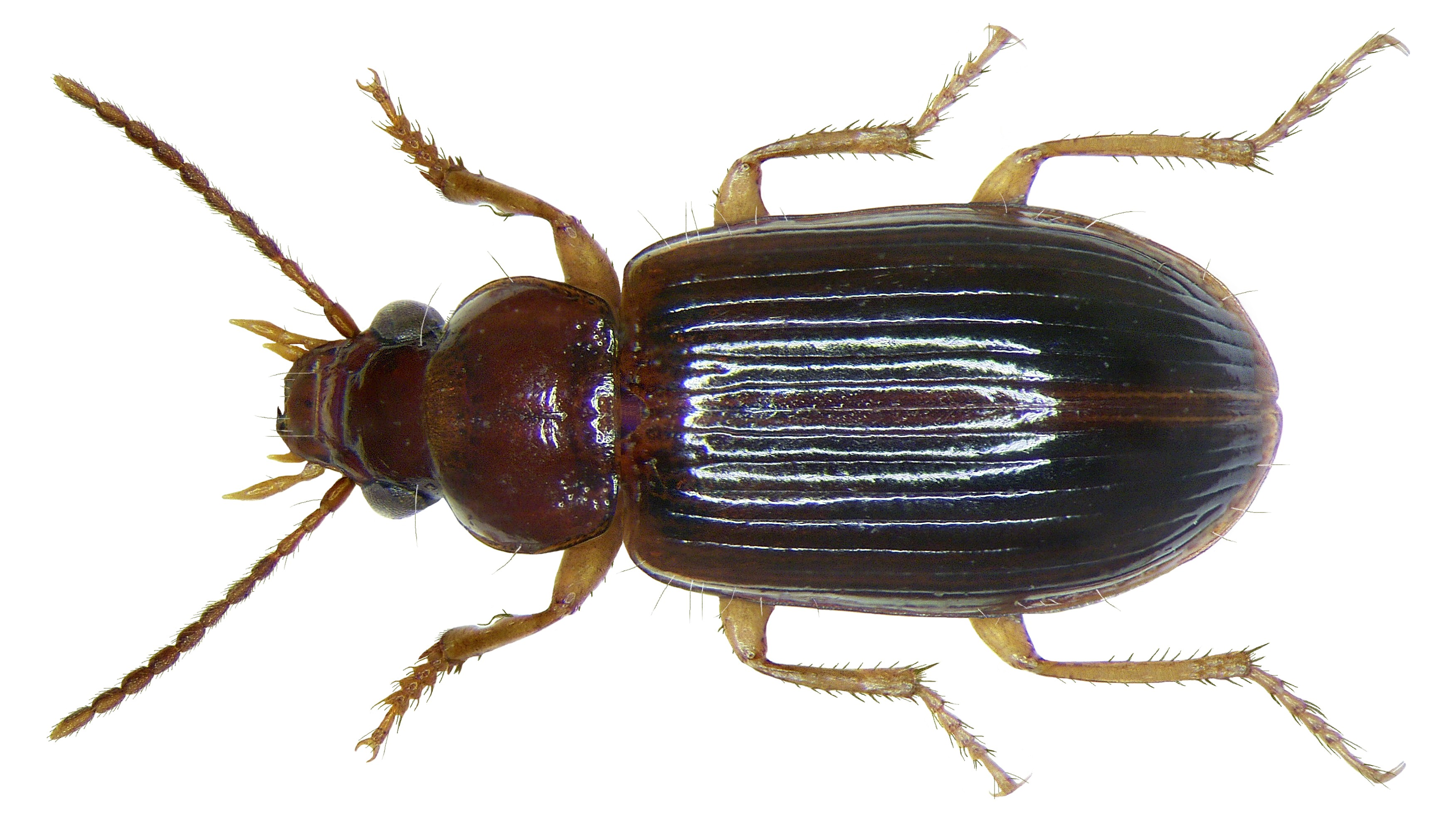

Scientific classification
- Domain: Eukaryota
- Kingdom: Animalia
- Phylum: Arthropoda
- Class: Insecta
- Order: Coleoptera
- Suborder: Adephaga
- Family: Carabidae
- Subfamily: Harpalinae
- Tribe: Harpalini
- Genus: Bradycellus
- Species: B. harpalinus

Binomial name
- Bradycellus harpalinus (Audinet-Serville, 1821)

= Bradycellus harpalinus =

Species of beetle

Bradycellus harpalinus is a species of ground beetle in the family Carabidae. It is found in North America and Europe.

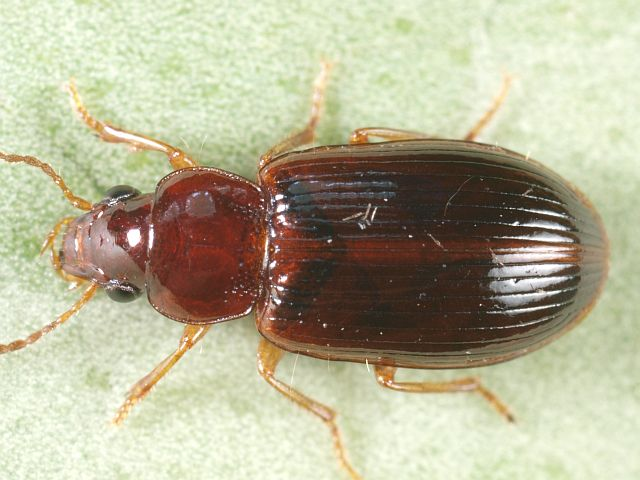
