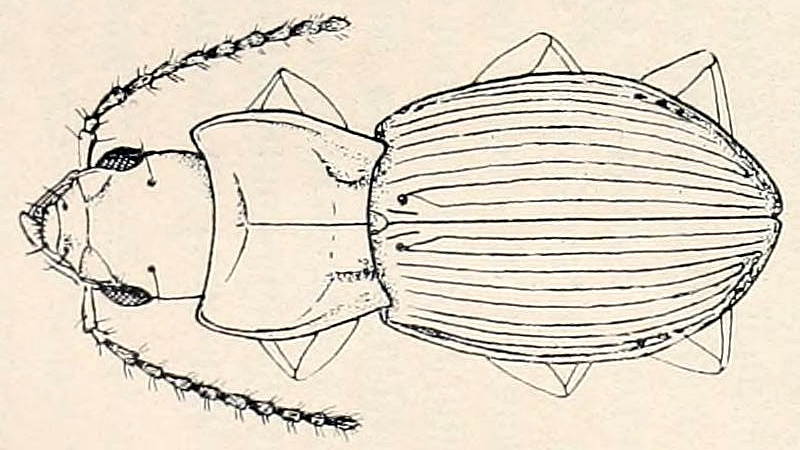
- Kenyacus ruwenzorii

Scientific classification
- Domain: Eukaryota
- Kingdom: Animalia
- Phylum: Arthropoda
- Class: Insecta
- Order: Coleoptera
- Suborder: Adephaga
- Family: Carabidae
- Subfamily: Harpalinae
- Tribe: Stenolophini
- Genus: Kenyacus; Alluaud, 1917

Synonyms
- Tropicoritus Alluaud, 1917

= Kenyacus =

Genus of beetles

Kenyacus is a genus of beetles in the family Carabidae first described by Charles Alluaud in 1917.

== Species ==
Kenyacus contains the following twenty-four species:

- Kenyacus acrobius Alluaud, 1917
- Kenyacus angustatus Kataev, 2019
- Kenyacus baleensis Clarke, 1973
- Kenyacus berndi Kataev, 2019
- Kenyacus elgonensis Basilewsky, 1948
- Kenyacus elveni Kataev, 2020
- Kenyacus gusarovi Kataev, 2019
- Kenyacus hypsibius Alluaud, 1917
- Kenyacus jeanneli Basilewsky, 1948
- Kenyacus kinangopinus Basilewsky, 1948
- Kenyacus leleupi Basilewsky, 1951
- Kenyacus meruanus Basilewsky, 1962
- Kenyacus minor Basilewsky, 1951
- Kenyacus nyakasibanus Basilewsky, 1951
- Kenyacus oldeanicus Basilewsky, 1962
- Kenyacus parvus Kataev, 2019
- Kenyacus pusillus Kataev, 2019
- Kenyacus ruwenzoricus Basilewsky, 1955
- Kenyacus ruwenzorii (Alluaud, 1917)
- Kenyacus scotti Basilewsky, 1948
- Kenyacus similis Kataev, 2019
- Kenyacus subcaecus Basilewsky, 1956
- Kenyacus trechoides Kataev, 2019
- Kenyacus uluguruanus Basilewsky, 1976
