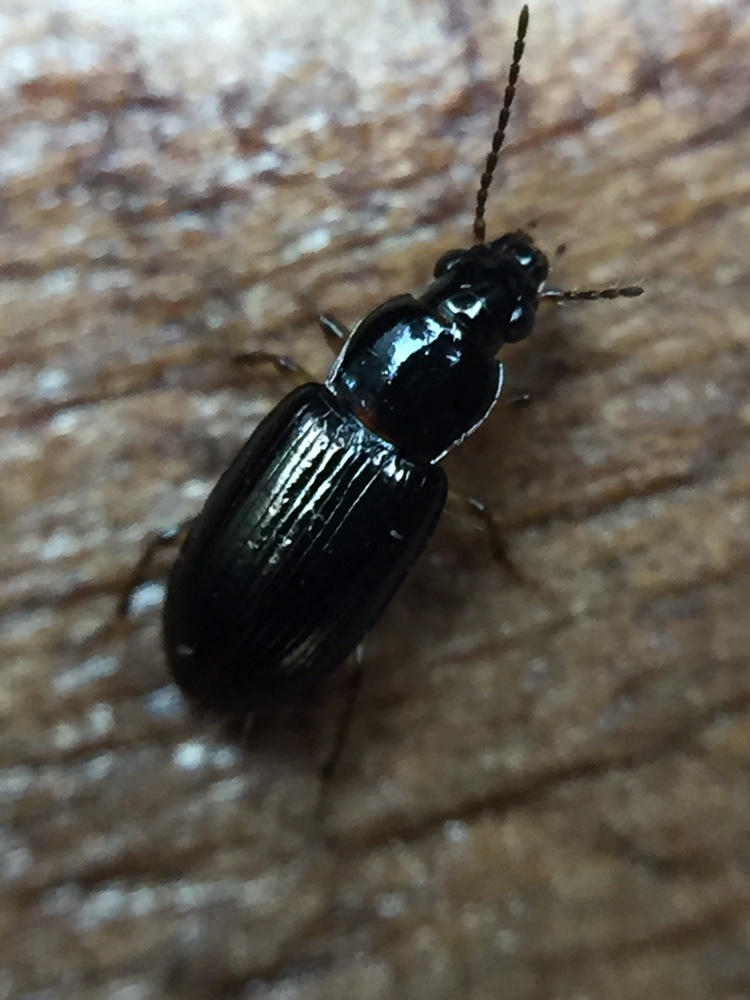
- Euthenarus promptus, New Zealand

Scientific classification
- Domain: Eukaryota
- Kingdom: Animalia
- Phylum: Arthropoda
- Class: Insecta
- Order: Coleoptera
- Suborder: Adephaga
- Family: Carabidae
- Subfamily: Harpalinae
- Tribe: Stenolophini
- Genus: Euthenarus; Bates, 1874

Synonyms
- Euthenaris Csiki, 1932

= Euthenarus =

Genus of beetles

Euthenarus is a genus in the ground beetle family Carabidae. There are about eight described species in Euthenarus, found in Australia and New Zealand.

== Species ==
These eight species belong to the genus Euthenarus:

- Euthenarus bicolor B.Moore, 1985 (Australia and New Zealand)
- Euthenarus brevicollis Bates, 1874 (New Zealand)
- Euthenarus brunneus Sloane, 1917 (Australia)
- Euthenarus comes Sloane, 1898 (Australia)
- Euthenarus morganensis (Blackburn, 1890) (Australia)
- Euthenarus nigellus Sloane, 1920 (Australia)
- Euthenarus promptus (Erichson, 1842) (Australia and New Zealand)
- Euthenarus puncticollis Bates, 1874 (New Zealand)
