= Bradycellus chavesi =

Conservation status
- Extinct (IUCN 3.1)

Scientific classification
- Kingdom: Animalia
- Phylum: Arthropoda
- Class: Insecta
- Order: Coleoptera
- Suborder: Adephaga
- Family: Carabidae
- Tribe: Harpalini
- Genus: Bradycellus
- Species: †B. chavesi

Binomial name
- †Bradycellus chavesi Alluaud, 1919

Species of beetle

Bradycellus chavesi is a species of ground beetle in the family Carabidae. It was endemic to São Miguel Island in the Azores, but is currently considered extinct.
