= Hemiaulax =

Scientific classification
- Domain: Eukaryota
- Kingdom: Animalia
- Phylum: Arthropoda
- Class: Insecta
- Order: Coleoptera
- Suborder: Adephaga
- Family: Carabidae
- Subfamily: Harpalinae
- Tribe: Stenolophini
- Genus: Hemiaulax; Bates, 1892
- Species: H. dentipennis

Binomial name
- Hemiaulax dentipennis (Bates, 1892)

Genus of beetles

Hemiaulax is a genus in the beetle family Carabidae. This genus has a single species, Hemiaulax dentipennis. It is found in Myanmar.
