= Goniocellus =

Scientific classification
- Kingdom: Animalia
- Phylum: Arthropoda
- Class: Insecta
- Order: Coleoptera
- Suborder: Adephaga
- Family: Carabidae
- Subfamily: Harpalinae
- Tribe: Stenolophini
- Genus: Goniocellus; Casey, 1914

Genus of beetles

Goniocellus is a genus of carabids in the beetle family Carabidae. There are at least two described species in Goniocellus, found in Panama.

== Species ==
These two species belong to the genus Goniocellus:

- Goniocellus bifossifrons Casey, 1914
- Goniocellus isthmianus Casey, 1914
