= Uenanthracus =

Scientific classification
- Kingdom: Animalia
- Phylum: Arthropoda
- Class: Insecta
- Order: Coleoptera
- Suborder: Adephaga
- Family: Carabidae
- Subfamily: Harpalinae
- Tribe: Stenolophini
- Genus: Uenanthracus; Kasahara, 1994
- Species: U. perigonoides

Binomial name
- Uenanthracus perigonoides Kasahara, 1994

Species of beetle

Uenanthracus is a genus of ground beetles in the family Carabidae. This genus has a single species, Uenanthracus perigonoides, found in Japan.
