= Rhabidius =

Scientific classification
- Kingdom: Animalia
- Phylum: Arthropoda
- Class: Insecta
- Order: Coleoptera
- Suborder: Adephaga
- Family: Carabidae
- Subfamily: Harpalinae
- Genus: Rhabidius; Basilewsky, 1948

Genus of beetles

Rhabidius is a genus of beetles in the family Carabidae, containing the following species:

- Rhabidius camerunensis Basilewsky, 1948
- Rhabidius jeanneli Basilewsky, 1948
