= Angionychus =

Angionychus lividus

Scientific classification
- Kingdom: Animalia
- Phylum: Arthropoda
- Class: Insecta
- Order: Coleoptera
- Suborder: Adephaga
- Family: Carabidae
- Subfamily: Harpalinae
- Genus: Angionychus; Klug, 1853
- Species: A. lividus

Binomial name
- Angionychus lividus Klug, 1853

Genus of beetles

Angionychus lividus is a species of beetle in the family Carabidae, the only species in the genus Angionychus.
