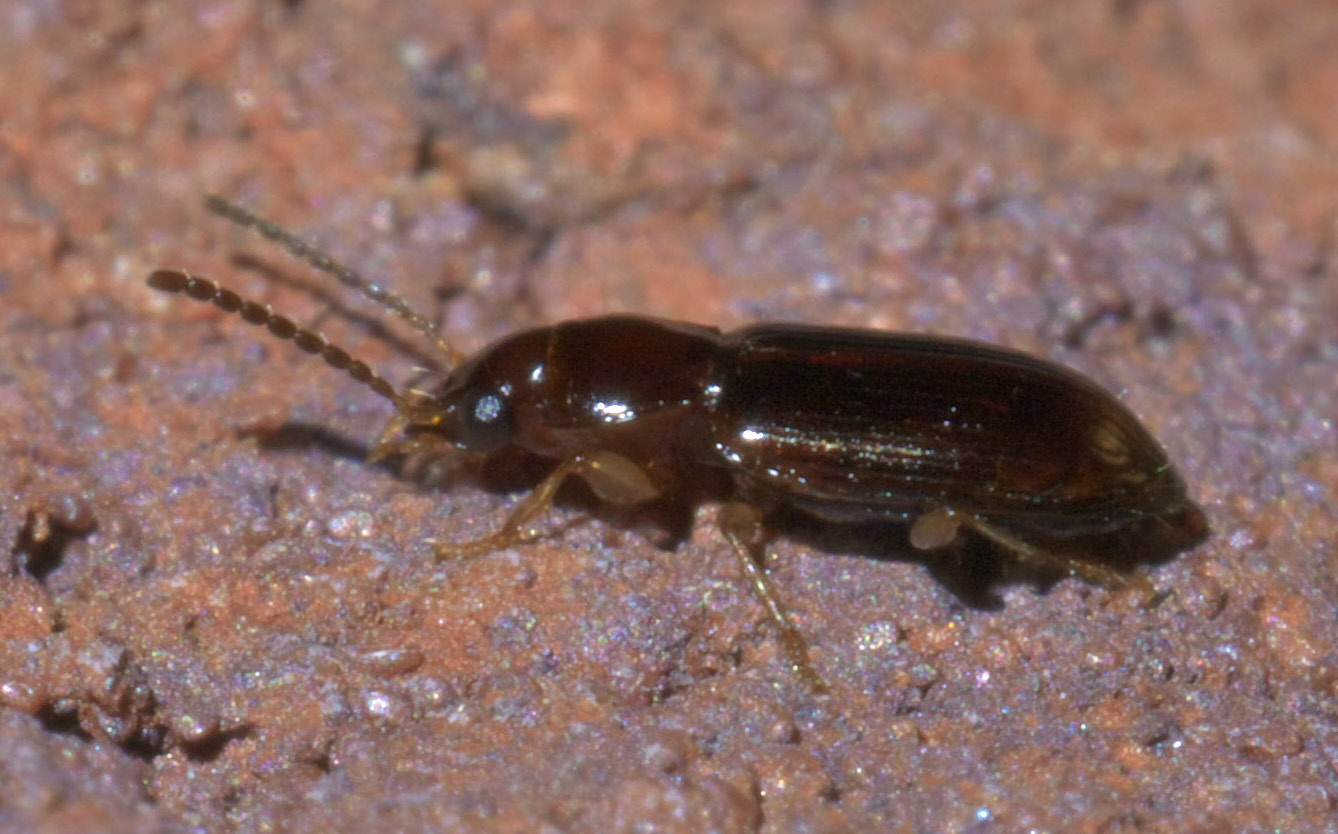
- Bradycellus

Scientific classification
- Kingdom: Animalia
- Phylum: Arthropoda
- Class: Insecta
- Order: Coleoptera
- Suborder: Adephaga
- Family: Carabidae
- Subfamily: Harpalinae
- Tribe: Harpalini
- Genus: Bradycellus; Erichson, 1837

= Bradycellus =

Genus of beetles

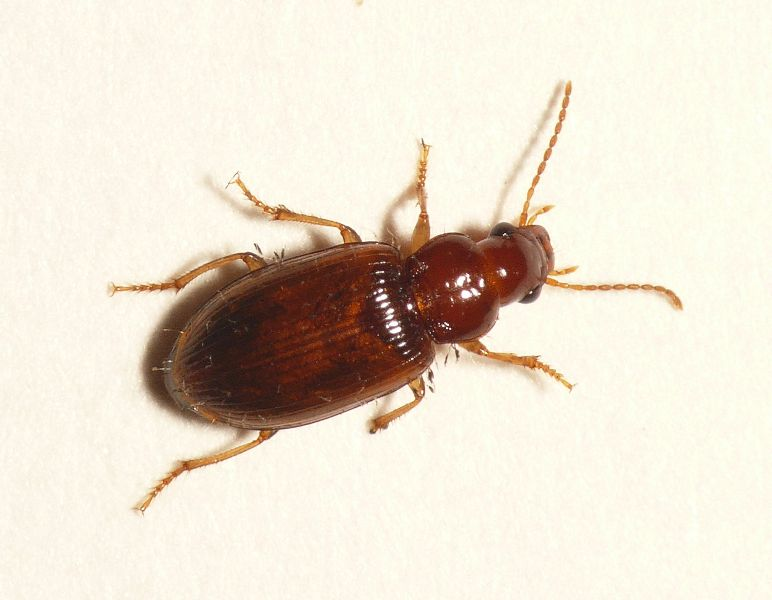
Bradycellus verbasci

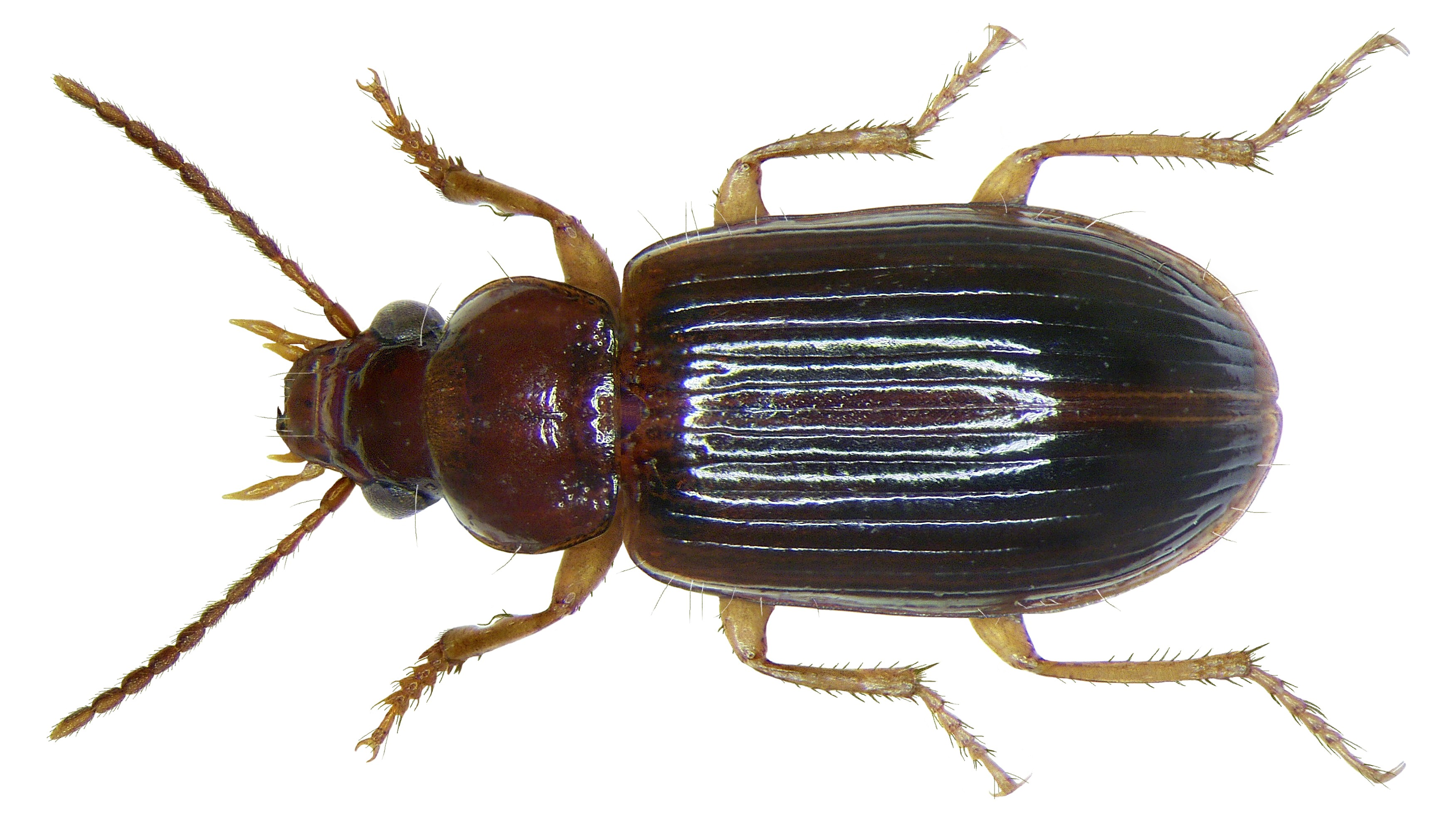
Bradycellus harpalinus

Bradycellus is a genus in the beetle family Carabidae. There are more than 120 described species in Bradycellus.

== Species ==
These 126 belong to the genus Bradycellus:

Subgenus Atlantocellus Wrase & Jaeger, 1996
Bradycellus assingi Wrase & Jaeger, 1996
Bradycellus excultus Wollaston, 1854
Bradycellus maderensis Mateu, 1958
Bradycellus ventricosus Wollaston, 1864
Bradycellus wollastoni Wrase & Jaeger, 1996
Subgenus Bradycelloides Habu, 1973
Bradycellus fimbriatus Bates, 1873
Subgenus Bradycellus Erichson, 1837

Bradycellus aequatorius Moret, 2001
Bradycellus alticola Britton, 1948
Bradycellus angulifer Bates, 1882
Bradycellus apicalis Putzeys, 1878
Bradycellus arcobasis (Solier, 1849)
Bradycellus bicolor Jaeger, 1998
Bradycellus brevitarsis Normand, 1946
Bradycellus caucasicus (Chaudoir, 1846)
Bradycellus celeripes Putzeys, 1878
Bradycellus chavesi Alluaud, 1919 - (Ground-beetle)
Bradycellus chilensis (Dejean, 1831)
Bradycellus circumdatus (Bates, 1878)
Bradycellus cristobalinus Franz, 1986
Bradycellus csikii Laczo, 1912
Bradycellus cubanus Darlington, 1934
Bradycellus distinctus (Dejean, 1829)
Bradycellus fenderi Hatch, 1951
Bradycellus flohri (Bates, 1878)
Bradycellus galapagorum Franz, 1986
Bradycellus ganglbaueri Apfelbeck, 1904
Bradycellus harpalinus (Audinet-Serville, 1821)
Bradycellus heinzi Jaeger, 1990
Bradycellus impressifrons (Solier, 1849)
Bradycellus insularis Reichardt, 1976
Bradycellus isabelae Franz, 1986
Bradycellus isabelanus Franz, 1986
Bradycellus limbicollis Bates, 1882
Bradycellus lusitanicus (Dejean, 1829)
Bradycellus martinezi Moret, 2001
Bradycellus nigrellus Bates, 1882
Bradycellus ruficollis (Stephens, 1828)
Bradycellus schaubergeri Jaeger, 1995
Bradycellus secundus Wrase, 1998
Bradycellus selleanus Darlington, 1936
Bradycellus sharpi Joy, 1912
Bradycellus suturiger Putzeys, 1878
Bradycellus tibialis (Solier, 1849)
Bradycellus unistriatus (Dejean, 1831)
Bradycellus velatus Darlington, 1934
Bradycellus verbasci (Duftschmid, 1812)
Bradycellus youngi Moret, 2001

Subgenus Catharellus Casey, 1914
Bradycellus lecontei Csiki, 1932
Subgenus Desbordesius Maindron, 1906
Bradycellus laeticolor Bates, 1873
Subgenus Liocellus Motschulsky, 1864
Bradycellus curticollis (Casey, 1924)
Bradycellus intermedius (Fall, 1905)
Bradycellus laticollis (Casey, 1924)
Bradycellus nitidus (Dejean, 1829)
Bradycellus obsoletus (Say, 1830)
Bradycellus obtusus (Fall, 1905)
Bradycellus politus (Fall, 1905)
Bradycellus tahoensis (Casey, 1924)
Subgenus Lipalocellus Ball & Bousquet, 2000
Bradycellus nigrinus (Dejean, 1829)
Bradycellus semipubescens Lindroth, 1968
Subgenus Stenocellus Casey, 1914

Bradycellus ardelio (Casey, 1914)
Bradycellus aridus (Casey, 1914)
Bradycellus californicus (LeConte, 1857)
Bradycellus carolinensis (Casey, 1924)
Bradycellus congener (LeConte, 1847)
Bradycellus decorus (Casey, 1914)
Bradycellus discipulus (Casey, 1914)
Bradycellus elongatus (Motschulsky, 1860)
Bradycellus exstans (Casey, 1914)
Bradycellus festinans (Casey, 1914)
Bradycellus humboldtianus (Casey, 1924)
Bradycellus insulsus (Casey, 1914)
Bradycellus larvatus (Casey, 1914)
Bradycellus lineatus (Casey, 1914)
Bradycellus lustrellus (Casey, 1914)
Bradycellus montanus (Casey, 1914)
Bradycellus nebulosus LeConte, 1853
Bradycellus neglectus (LeConte, 1847)
Bradycellus nigerrimus Lindroth, 1968
Bradycellus nigriceps LeConte, 1869
Bradycellus nubifer LeConte, 1858
Bradycellus picipes (Casey, 1914)
Bradycellus provoensis (Casey, 1914)
Bradycellus puncticollis (Casey, 1914)
Bradycellus purgatus (Casey, 1914)
Bradycellus rivalis LeConte, 1858
Bradycellus rupestris (Say, 1823)
Bradycellus sejunctus (Casey, 1914)
Bradycellus socors (Casey, 1914)
Bradycellus suavis (Casey, 1914)
Bradycellus subcordatus Chaudoir, 1868
Bradycellus supplex (Casey, 1914)
Bradycellus symetricus (Motschulsky, 1850)
Bradycellus tantillus (Dejean, 1829)
Bradycellus veronianus (Casey, 1924)

Subgenus Tachycellus A.Morawitz, 1862

Bradycellus anchomenoides (Bates, 1873)
Bradycellus angulicollis Jaeger, 1995
Bradycellus bartschi Wrase, 1998
Bradycellus chinensis (Jedlicka, 1953)
Bradycellus confusus Jaeger & Wrase, 1994
Bradycellus crassicerus N.Ito, 1985
Bradycellus curtulus (Motschulsky, 1860)
Bradycellus discrepans Jaeger, 1995
Bradycellus glabratulus Lafer, 1989
Bradycellus glabratus Reitter, 1894
Bradycellus grandiceps (Bates, 1873)
Bradycellus jaegeri Morita, 1997
Bradycellus kataevi Jaeger & Wrase, 1994
Bradycellus klapperichi Jaeger & Wrase, 1994
Bradycellus koltzei Reitter, 1900
Bradycellus laevicollis Poppius, 1908
Bradycellus mons Habu, 1975
Bradycellus nepalensis Jaeger & N.Ito, 1995
Bradycellus nipponensis Jaeger & Wrase, 1994
Bradycellus ovalipennis Jaeger in Jaeger & Wrase, 1996
Bradycellus picipes N.Ito & Jaeger, 2000
Bradycellus plutenkoi Lafer, 1989
Bradycellus saitoi Morita, 1997
Bradycellus schuelkei Jaeger & Wrase, 1996
Bradycellus subditus (Lewis, 1879)
Bradycellus yulongshanus Jaeger in Jaeger & Wrase, 1996
Bradycellus yushanensis N.Ito, 1985

Subgenus Triliarthrus Casey, 1914
Bradycellus atrimedeus (Say, 1823)
Bradycellus badipennis (Haldeman, 1843)
Bradycellus conformis (Fall, 1905)
Bradycellus georgei Lindroth, 1968
Bradycellus kirbyi (G.Horn, 1883)
Bradycellus lugubris (LeConte, 1847)
