= Anthracus haemorrhous =

Scientific classification
- Kingdom: Animalia
- Phylum: Arthropoda
- Class: Insecta
- Order: Coleoptera
- Suborder: Adephaga
- Family: Carabidae
- Genus: Anthracus
- Species: A. haemorrhous

Binomial name
- Anthracus haemorrhous (Louwerens, 1952)

Synonyms
- Acupalpus haemorrhous Louwerens, 1952

Species of beetle

Anthracus haemorrhous is an insect-eating ground beetle of the Anthracus genus. It is found in Indonesia.
