= Straneotia confundis =

Scientific classification
- Kingdom: Animalia
- Phylum: Arthropoda
- Class: Insecta
- Order: Coleoptera
- Suborder: Adephaga
- Family: Carabidae
- Tribe: Lebiini
- Subtribe: Agrina
- Genus: Straneotia
- Species: S. confundis

Binomial name
- Straneotia confundis Aldebron & Erwin, 2018

Species of beetle

The Confusing slim arboreal carabid, (Straneotia confundis), is a species of beetle in the family Carabidae. It is found in Amazonian lowlands in the Yasuní area of northeastern Ecuador.

They are macropterous and capable of flight. Standard body length is 4.46 mm. Very shiny dorsum. Head planar and perfectly smooth. Eye large and sub-hemispheric. Antenna short. Pronotum moderately narrow. Abdomen glabrous with normal ambulatory setae.

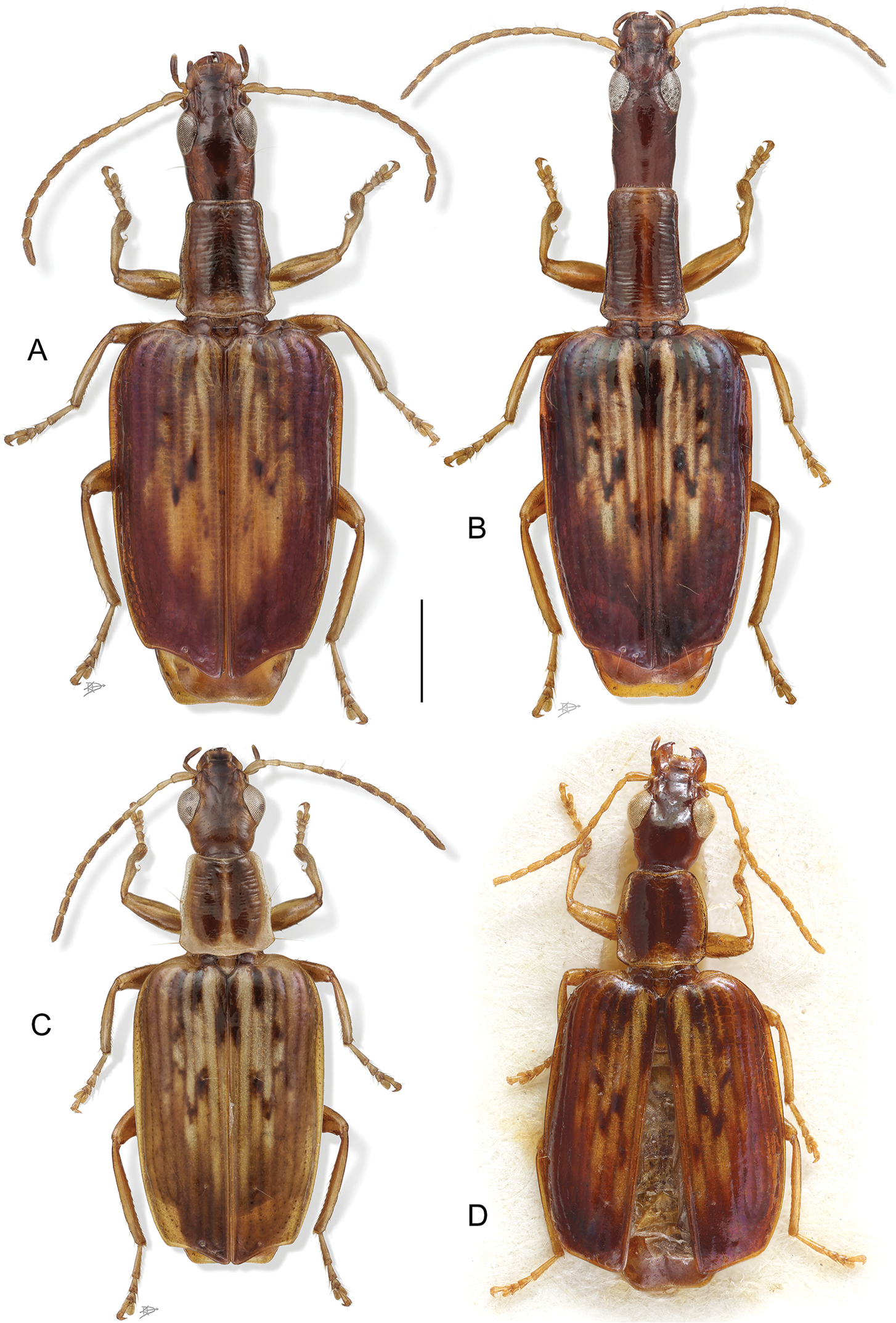
Straneotia confundis (C) Aldebron & Erwin, sp. n., male, with other Straneotia species. Scale bar: 1.00 mm (A–C); ABL = 5.5 mm (D).
