= Straneotia amazonica =

Scientific classification
- Kingdom: Animalia
- Phylum: Arthropoda
- Class: Insecta
- Order: Coleoptera
- Suborder: Adephaga
- Family: Carabidae
- Tribe: Lebiini
- Subtribe: Agrina
- Genus: Straneotia
- Species: S. amazonica

Binomial name
- Straneotia amazonica Mateu, 1961

Species of beetle

Straneotia amazonica, the Amazon slim arboreal carabid, is a species of beetle in the family Carabidae. It is found in western Amazon Basin.

They are macropterous and capable of flight.

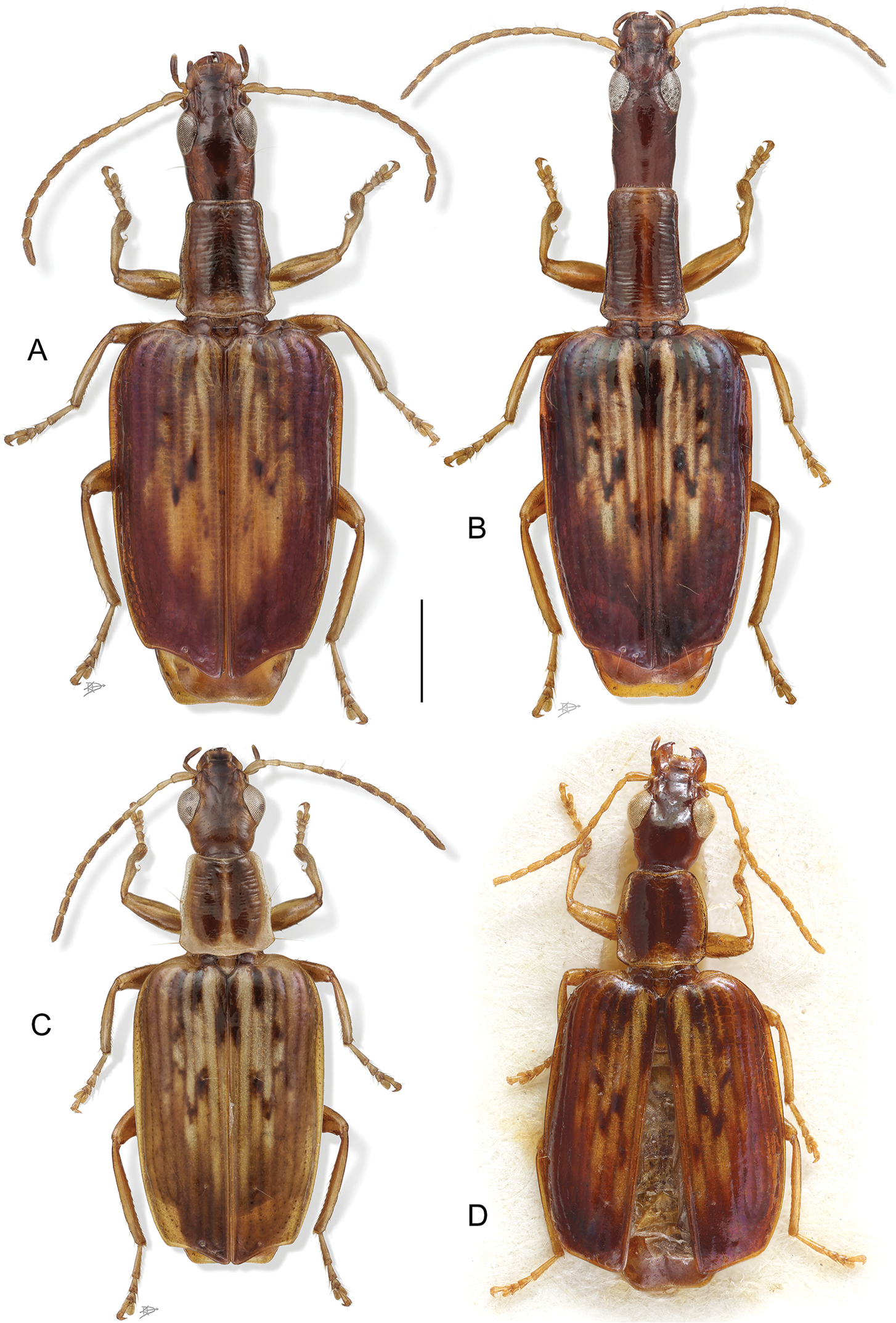
Straneotia amazonica (D) Mateu, Holotype female, alongside other Straneotia species. Scale bar: 1.00 mm (A–C); ABL = 5.5 mm (D).
