= Straneotia moi =

Scientific classification
- Kingdom: Animalia
- Phylum: Arthropoda
- Class: Insecta
- Order: Coleoptera
- Suborder: Adephaga
- Family: Carabidae
- Tribe: Lebiini
- Subtribe: Agrina
- Genus: Straneotia
- Species: S. moi

Binomial name
- Straneotia moi Aldebron & Erwin, 2018

Species of beetle

Straneotia moi, the snake-head slim arboreal carabid, is a species of beetle in the family Carabidae. It is found in French Guiana.

They are macropterous and capable of flight. Standard body length is 5.35 mm. Elytra, forebody, and head markedly shiny. Antenna moderately long. Pronotum very narrow.

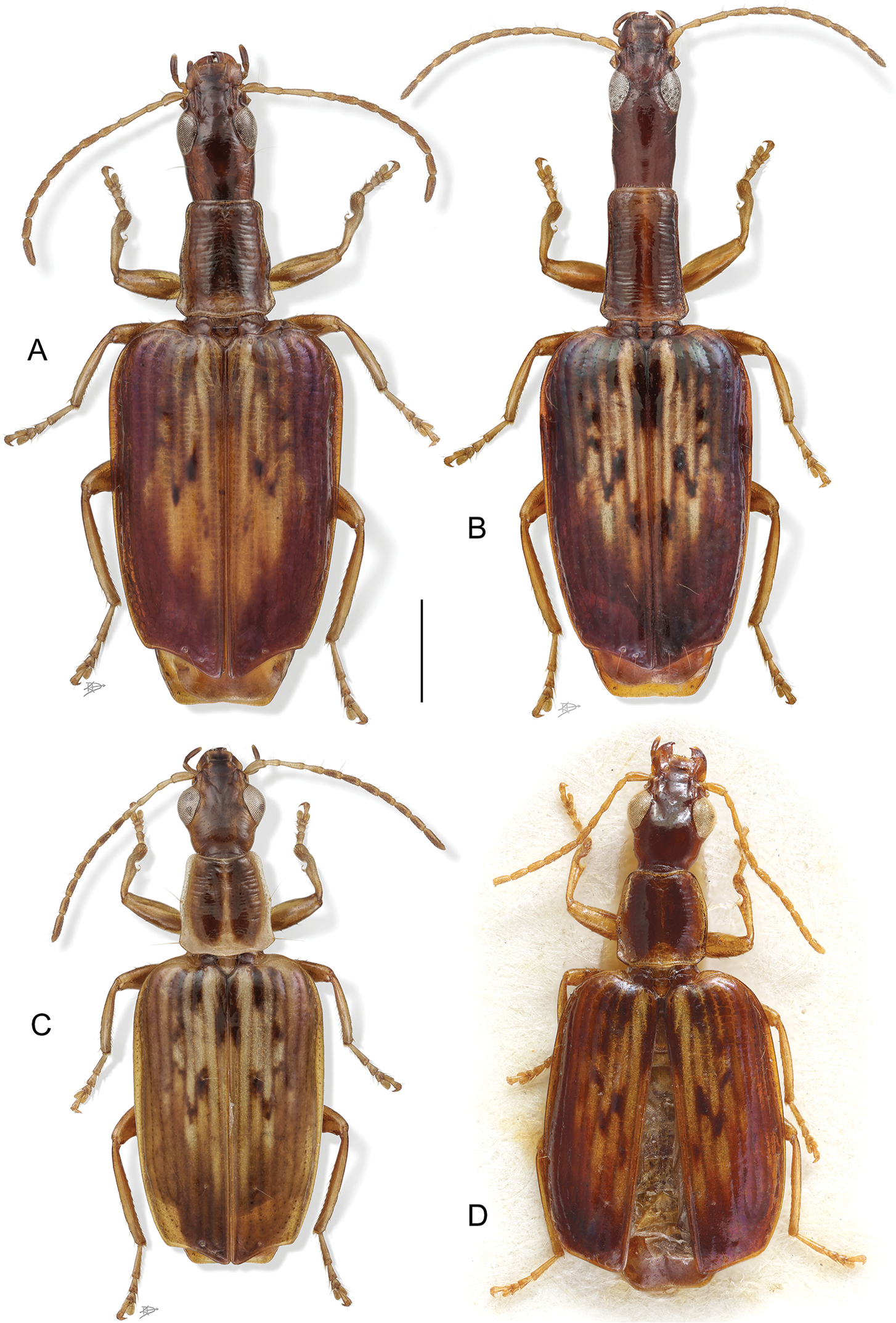
Straneotia moi (B) Aldebron & Erwin, sp. n., female, with other Straneotia species. Scale bar: 1.00 mm (A–C); ABL = 5.5 mm (D).
