= Straneotia freyi =

Scientific classification
- Domain: Eukaryota
- Kingdom: Animalia
- Phylum: Arthropoda
- Class: Insecta
- Order: Coleoptera
- Suborder: Adephaga
- Family: Carabidae
- Tribe: Lebiini
- Subtribe: Agrina
- Genus: Straneotia
- Species: S. freyi

Binomial name
- Straneotia freyi Mateu, 1961

Species of beetle

Straneotia freyi, the Frey's slim arboreal carabid, is a species of beetle in the family Carabidae. It is found in Amazonian lowlands near Belém, Brazil.

They are macropterous and capable of flight. Head markedly elongate behind the eyes.
