= Straneotia =

Scientific classification
- Kingdom: Animalia
- Phylum: Arthropoda
- Class: Insecta
- Order: Coleoptera
- Suborder: Adephaga
- Family: Carabidae
- Tribe: Lebiini
- Subtribe: Agrina
- Genus: Straneotia; Mateu, 1961

Genus of beetles

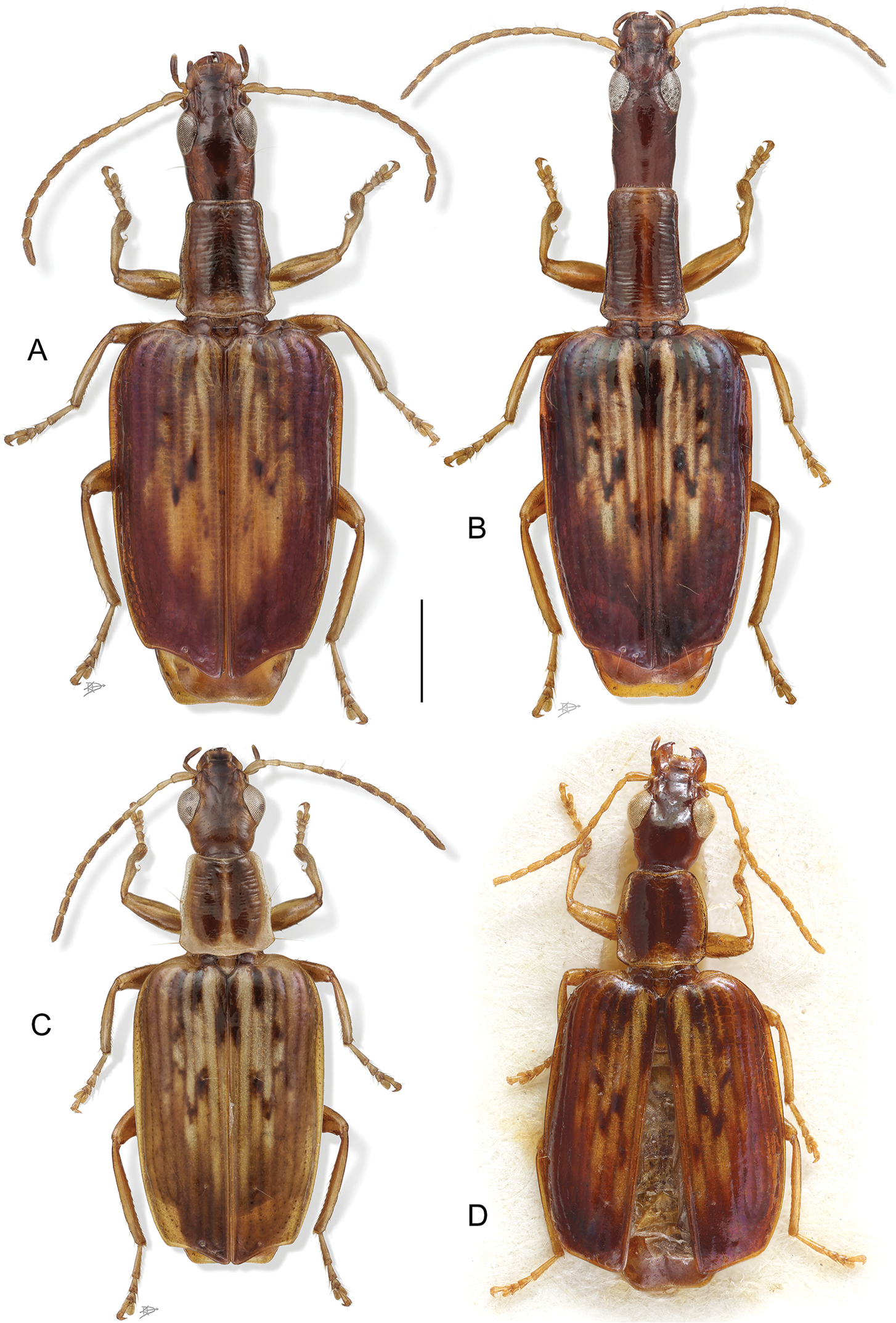
Photo-illustration of Straneotia specimens. A: Straneotia cylindroceps Erwin & Aldebron, sp. n., female; B: Straneotia moi Aldebron & Erwin, sp. n., female; C: Straneotia confundis Aldebron & Erwin, sp. n., male; D: Straneotia amazonica Mateu, Holotype female. Scale bar: 1.00 mm (A–C); ABL = 5.5 mm (D).

Straneotia is a genus of beetles in the family Carabidae, containing the following species:

- Straneotia amazonica Mateu, 1961 - Brazil
- Straneotia confundis Aldebron & Erwin, 2018 - Ecuador
- Straneotia cylindroceps Erwin & Aldebron, 2018 - French Guiana
- Straneotia freyi Mateu, 1961 - Brazil
- Straneotia moi Aldebron & Erwin, 2018 - French Guiana
