= Straneotia cylindroceps =

Scientific classification
- Kingdom: Animalia
- Phylum: Arthropoda
- Class: Insecta
- Order: Coleoptera
- Suborder: Adephaga
- Family: Carabidae
- Tribe: Lebiini
- Subtribe: Agrina
- Genus: Straneotia
- Species: S. cylindroceps

Binomial name
- Straneotia cylindroceps Erwin & Aldebron, 2018

Species of beetle

Straneotia cylindroceps, the tube-headed slim arboreal carabid, is a species of beetle in the family Carabidae. It is found in Yasuní area of northeastern Ecuador.

They are macropterous and capable of flight. Standard body length is 5.22–5.23 mm. Elytra with metallic violaceous. Forebody and head markedly shiny. Antenna moderately long. Pronotum very narrow. Abdomen glabrous.

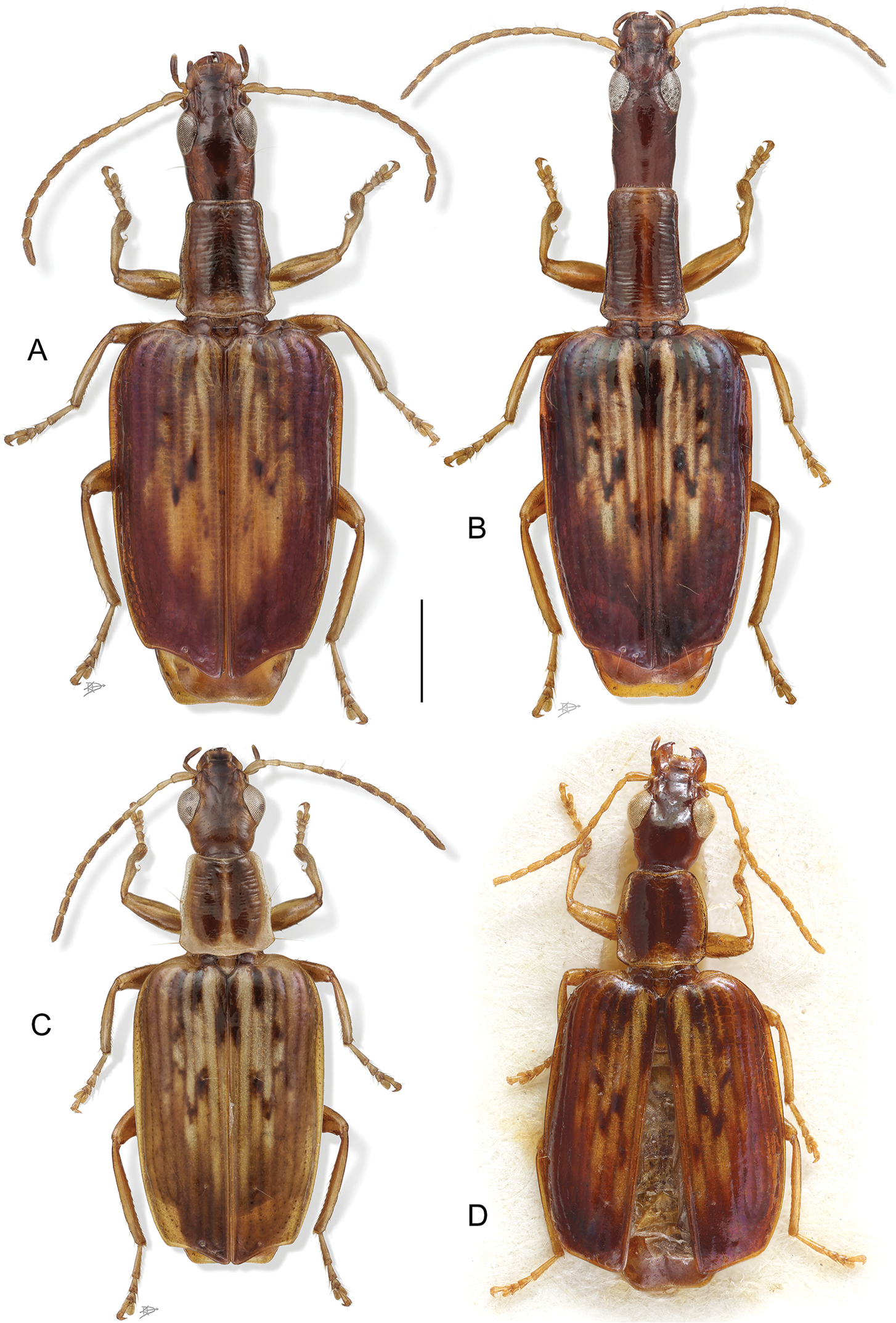
Straneotia cylindroceps (A) Erwin & Aldebron, sp. n., female, with other Straneotia species. Scale bar: 1.00 mm (A–C); ABL = 5.5 mm (D).
