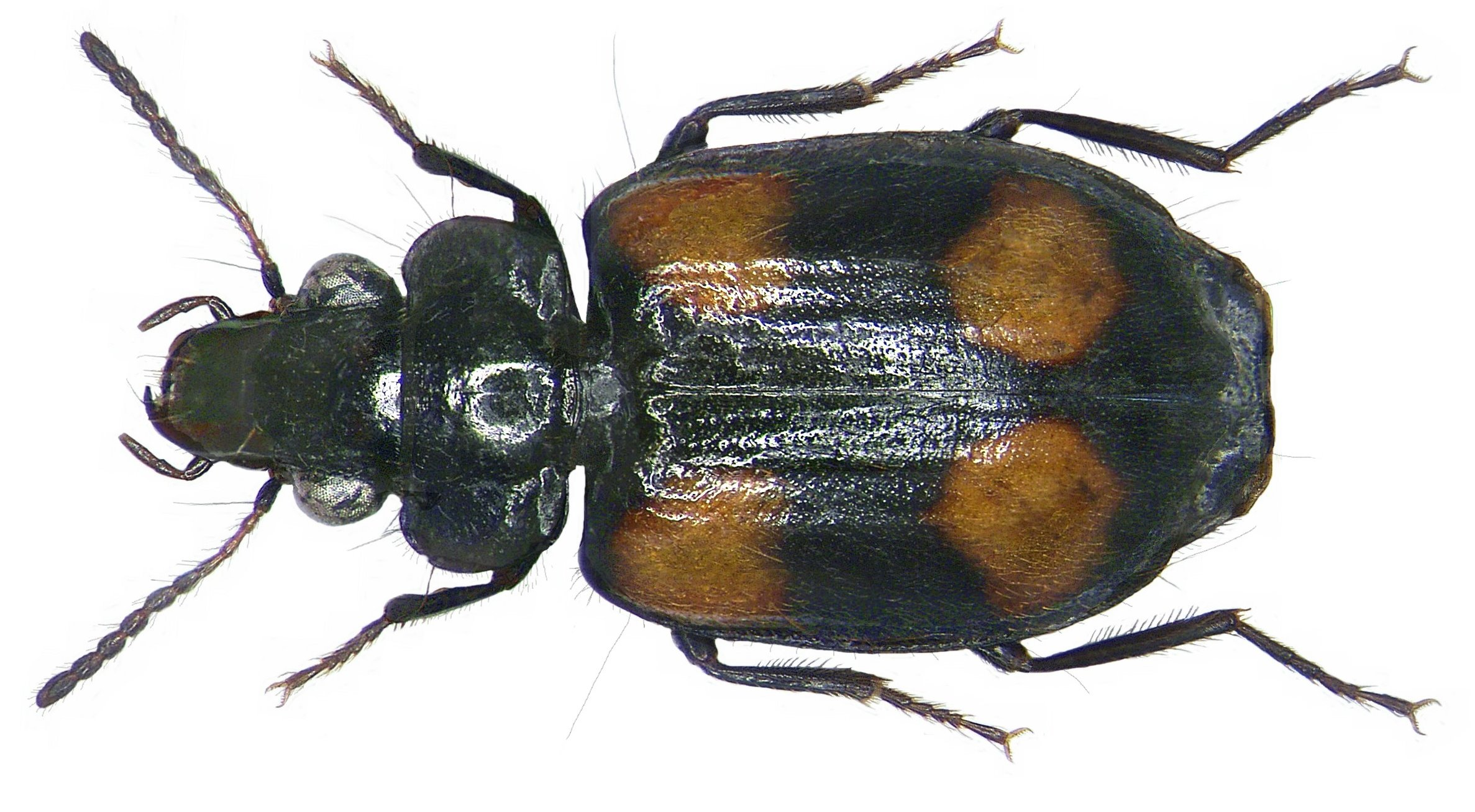
- Minuthodes multisetosa

Scientific classification
- Domain: Eukaryota
- Kingdom: Animalia
- Phylum: Arthropoda
- Class: Insecta
- Order: Coleoptera
- Suborder: Adephaga
- Family: Carabidae
- Subfamily: Lebiinae
- Tribe: Lebiini
- Subtribe: Pericalina
- Genus: Minuthodes; Andrewes, 1941

Synonyms
- Platia Chaudoir, 1870

= Minuthodes =

Genus of beetles

Minuthodes is a genus in the ground beetle family Carabidae. There are more than 20 described species in Minuthodes.

== Species ==
These 21 species belong to the genus Minuthodes:

- Minuthodes atratus Baehr, 2006 (New Guinea)
- Minuthodes biplagiatus Baehr, 1998 (Indonesia, New Guinea)
- Minuthodes brachyderus (Chaudoir, 1870) (Indonesia)
- Minuthodes demarzi Baehr, 1989 (Australia)
- Minuthodes froggatti (W.J.MacLeay, 1888) (Australia)
- Minuthodes irregularis Darlington, 1968 (Indonesia, New Guinea)
- Minuthodes laticeps (Chaudoir, 1870) (Indonesia, New Guinea)
- Minuthodes lineellus (Chaudoir, 1870) (Indonesia)
- Minuthodes metallicus Darlington, 1968 (New Guinae)
- Minuthodes minimus (W.J.MacLeay, 1864) (Australia)
- Minuthodes multisetosus Baehr, 1998 (Indonesia, New Guinea)
- Minuthodes niger (Emden, 1937) (the Solomon Islands)
- Minuthodes papuanus (Sloane, 1917) (Indonesia, New Guinea)
- Minuthodes queenslandicus (Sloane, 1917) (Australia)
- Minuthodes rectimargo Baehr, 2006 (Indonesia, New Guinea)
- Minuthodes regularis Darlington, 1968 (Indonesia, New Guinea)
- Minuthodes serratus Baehr, 1989 (Australia)
- Minuthodes sexualis Darlington, 1968 (Indonesia, New Guinea)
- Minuthodes simplex Darlington, 1968 (New Guinea)
- Minuthodes trimaculatus Baehr, 2001 (Australia)
- Minuthodes walfordi Baehr, 1994 (Australia)
