= Coptopterella =

Scientific classification
- Domain: Eukaryota
- Kingdom: Animalia
- Phylum: Arthropoda
- Class: Insecta
- Order: Coleoptera
- Suborder: Adephaga
- Family: Carabidae
- Subfamily: Lebiinae
- Tribe: Lebiini
- Subtribe: Pericalina
- Genus: Coptopterella; Basilewsky, 1961
- Species: C. scutellata

Binomial name
- Coptopterella scutellata Basilewsky, 1961

Genus of beetles

Coptopterella is a genus in the ground beetle family Carabidae. This genus has a single species, Coptopterella scutellata. It is found in Cameroon and the Democratic Republic of the Congo.
