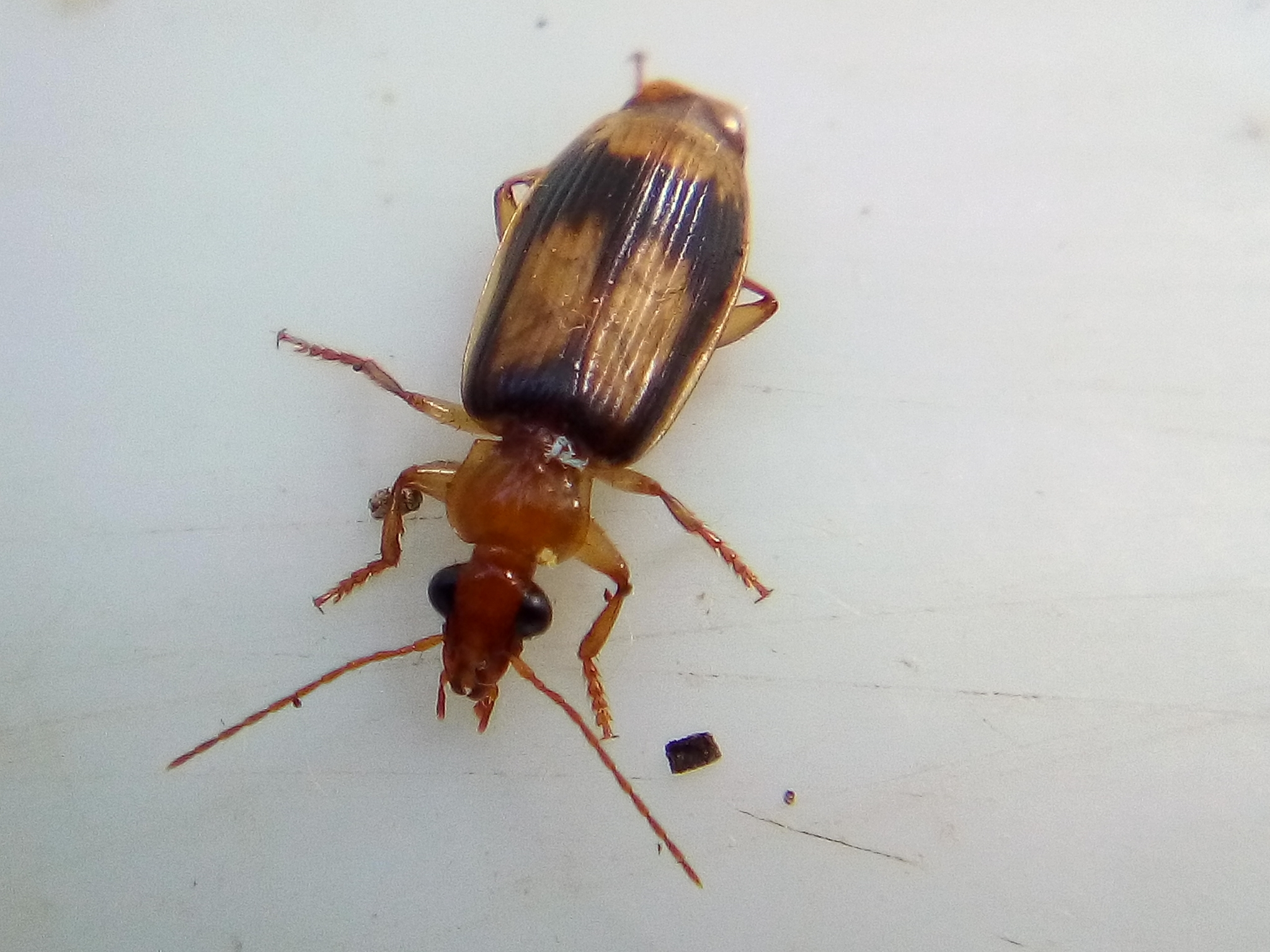
- Trigonothops pacifica, New Zealand

Scientific classification
- Domain: Eukaryota
- Kingdom: Animalia
- Phylum: Arthropoda
- Class: Insecta
- Order: Coleoptera
- Suborder: Adephaga
- Family: Carabidae
- Subfamily: Lebiinae
- Tribe: Lebiini
- Subtribe: Agrina
- Genus: Trigonothops; W.J.MacLeay, 1864

= Trigonothops =

Genus of beetles

Trigonothops is a genus in the beetle family Carabidae. There are about 12 described species in Trigonothops found in Oceania.

== Species ==
These 12 species belong to the genus Trigonothops:

- Trigonothops dimidiatus (W.J.MacLeay, 1888) (Australia)
- Trigonothops fasciatus W.J.MacLeay, 1888 (Australia)
- Trigonothops flavofasciatus Chaudoir, 1877 (Australia)
- Trigonothops lateralis Darlington, 1968 (Indonesia and New Guinea)
- Trigonothops longiplaga Chaudoir, 1877 (Australia)
- Trigonothops occidentalis Blackburn, 1892 (Australia)
- Trigonothops ornatus W.J.MacLeay, 1888 (Australia)
- Trigonothops pacificus (Erichson, 1842) (Australia and New Zealand)
- Trigonothops pallidicollis W.J.MacLeay, 1864 (Australia)
- Trigonothops pallidior W.J.MacLeay, 1888 (Australia)
- Trigonothops pescotti (Oke, 1951) (Australia)
- Trigonothops vittipennis Sloane, 1908 (Australia)
