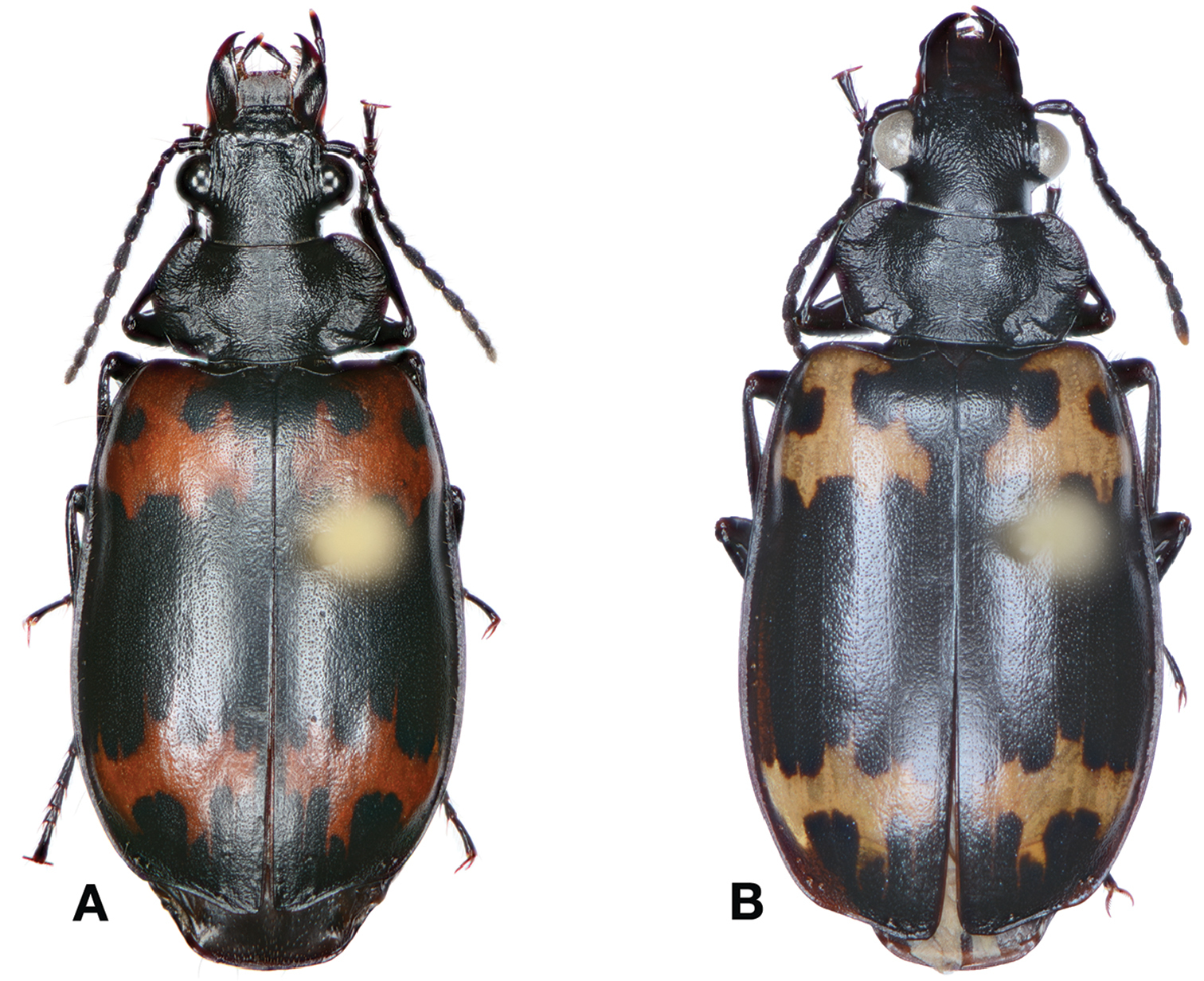
- Lioptera erotyloides

Scientific classification
- Domain: Eukaryota
- Kingdom: Animalia
- Phylum: Arthropoda
- Class: Insecta
- Order: Coleoptera
- Suborder: Adephaga
- Family: Carabidae
- Subfamily: Lebiinae
- Tribe: Lebiini
- Subtribe: Pericalina
- Genus: Lioptera; Chaudoir, 1870

= Lioptera =

Genus of beetles

Lioptera is a genus in the beetle family Carabidae. There are about 12 described species in Lioptera.

== Species ==
These 12 species belong to the genus Lioptera:

- Lioptera bloetei Louwerens, 1953 (Indonesia)
- Lioptera brevicornis Heller, 1903 (Bhutan and India)
- Lioptera erotyloides Bates, 1883 (China, South Korea, Japan, Taiwan, and Vietnam)
- Lioptera louwerensi Andrewes, 1941 (Indonesia)
- Lioptera malayana Heller, 1903 (Malaysia and Indonesia)
- Lioptera oberthueri Heller, 1903 (Bhutan and India)
- Lioptera plato Bates, 1883 (Indonesia and Borneo)
- Lioptera pseuda Heller, 1903 (Laos)
- Lioptera quadriguttata Chaudoir, 1870 (Philippines)
- Lioptera riedeli Baehr, 2010 (Indonesia)
- Lioptera storeyi Baehr, 2010 (Indonesia, New Guinea, and Papua)
- Lioptera tetraspila Heller, 1903 (Indonesia)
