= Demetriola =

Scientific classification
- Domain: Eukaryota
- Kingdom: Animalia
- Phylum: Arthropoda
- Class: Insecta
- Order: Coleoptera
- Suborder: Adephaga
- Family: Carabidae
- Subfamily: Lebiinae
- Tribe: Lebiini
- Subtribe: Peliocypadina
- Genus: Demetriola; Jeannel, 1949

Genus of beetles

Demetriola is a genus in the beetle family Carabidae. There are at least two described species in Demetriola, found in Madagascar.

== Species ==
These two species belong to the genus Demetriola:

- Demetriola levis Jeannel, 1949 (Madagascar)
- Demetriola maculata Facchini & Susini, 2011 (Madagascar)
