= Aristolebia =

Scientific classification
- Domain: Eukaryota
- Kingdom: Animalia
- Phylum: Arthropoda
- Class: Insecta
- Order: Coleoptera
- Suborder: Adephaga
- Family: Carabidae
- Subfamily: Lebiinae
- Tribe: Lebiini
- Genus: Aristolebia; Bates, 1892

Genus of beetles

Aristolebia is a genus in the beetle family Carabidae. There are more than 20 described species in Aristolebia.

== Species ==
These 22 species belong to the genus Aristolebia:

- Aristolebia apicalis Baehr, 2010 (Indonesia)
- Aristolebia baehri Hovorka, 2020 (Philippines)
- Aristolebia bastai Baehr, 2017 (Malaysia)
- Aristolebia capitis Darlington, 1968 (Indonesia and New Guinea)
- Aristolebia crucigera Baehr, 2004 (Thailand)
- Aristolebia davaonis (Heller, 1921) (Indonesia and Philippines)
- Aristolebia flavipennis Baehr, 2017 (Malaysia)
- Aristolebia floreana Baehr, 2011 (Indonesia)
- Aristolebia indica Kirschenhofer, 2011 (India)
- Aristolebia klimenkoi Anichtchenko, 2017 (Malaysia, Indonesia, Borneo)
- Aristolebia laosensis Baehr, 2017 (Laos)
- Aristolebia mucronata (Sloane, 1907) (Indonesia, New Guinea, Australia)
- Aristolebia oculata Baehr, 2010 (Indonesia)
- Aristolebia paracrucigera Baehr, 2011 (Indonesia)
- Aristolebia prattiana (Bates, 1889) (China)
- Aristolebia quadridentata Bates, 1892 (China, Nepal, India, Myanmar)
- Aristolebia quadrinotata Darlington, 1968 (New Guinea and Australia)
- Aristolebia rubiginosa Kirschenhofer, 2012 (India)
- Aristolebia rutilipennis Baehr, 2015 (Vietnam)
- Aristolebia saluki Anichtchenko, 2017 (India)
- Aristolebia timorensis Baehr, 2017 (Indonesia)
- Aristolebia triramosa Baehr, 2010 (Indonesia)
