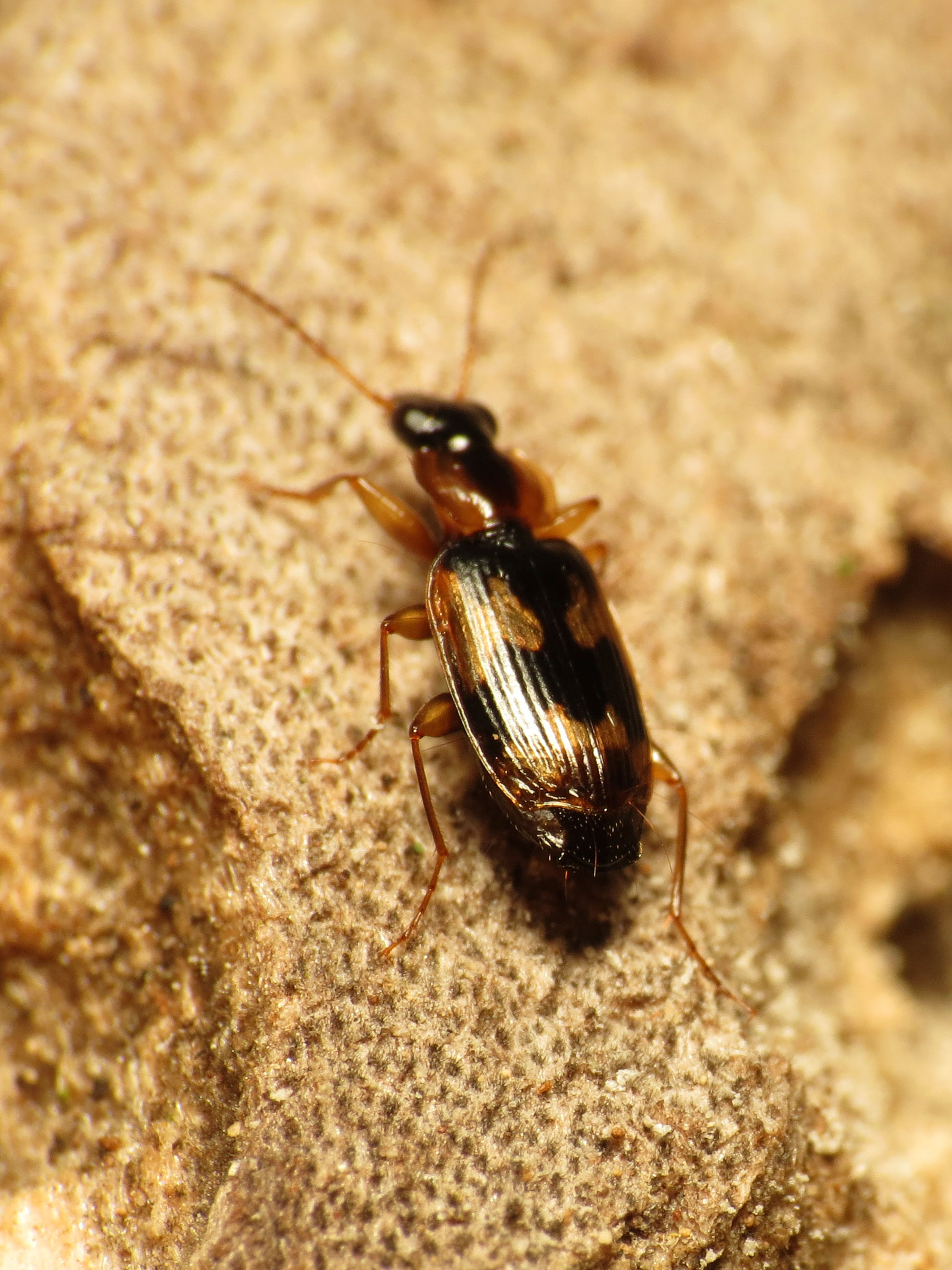
- Phloeoxena signata

Scientific classification
- Kingdom: Animalia
- Phylum: Arthropoda
- Class: Insecta
- Order: Coleoptera
- Suborder: Adephaga
- Family: Carabidae
- Tribe: Lebiini
- Genus: Phloeoxena; Chaudoir, 1869

= Phloeoxena =

Genus of beetles

Phloeoxena is a genus of beetles in the family Carabidae, containing the following species:

- Phloeoxena ashei Shpeley & Ball, 2000
- Phloeoxena batesi Ball, 1975
- Phloeoxena bembidioides (Bates, 1883)
- Phloeoxena biundata Steinheil, 1875
- Phloeoxena brooksi Shpeley & Ball, 2000
- Phloeoxena caudalis (Bates, 1883)
- Phloeoxena concolor (Ball, 1975)
- Phloeoxena costata Darlington1937
- Phloeoxena davidsoni Shpeley & Ball, 2000
- Phloeoxena dealata Darlington, 1937
- Phloeoxena geniculata Chaudoir, 1869
- Phloeoxena henryi Shpeley & Ball, 2000
- Phloeoxena herculeana Ball, 1975
- Phloeoxena imitatrix Darlington, 1934
- Phloeoxena lamuralla Shpeley & Ball, 2000
- Phloeoxena limbicollis Bates, 1884
- Phloeoxena megalops Bates, 1883
- Phloeoxena montana Darlington, 1935
- Phloeoxena nevermanni Shpeley & Ball, 2000
- Phloeoxena newtoni Ball, 1975
- Phloeoxena nigricollis Ball, 1975
- Phloeoxena nitida Shpeley & Ball, 2000
- Phloeoxena obscura Shpeley & Ball, 2000
- Phloeoxena picta Chaudoir, 1869
- Phloeoxena plagiata Darlington, 1934
- Phloeoxena pluto Ball, 1975
- Phloeoxena portoricensis Darlington, 1939
- Phloeoxena schwarzi Darlington, 1934
- Phloeoxena signata (Dejean, 1825)
- Phloeoxena totontepec Shpeley & Ball, 2000
- Phloeoxena turnbowi Shpeley & Ball, 2000
- Phloeoxena turrialba Shpeley & Ball, 2000
- Phloeoxena undata Chaudoir, 1869
- Phloeoxena viridis Shpeley & Ball, 2000
