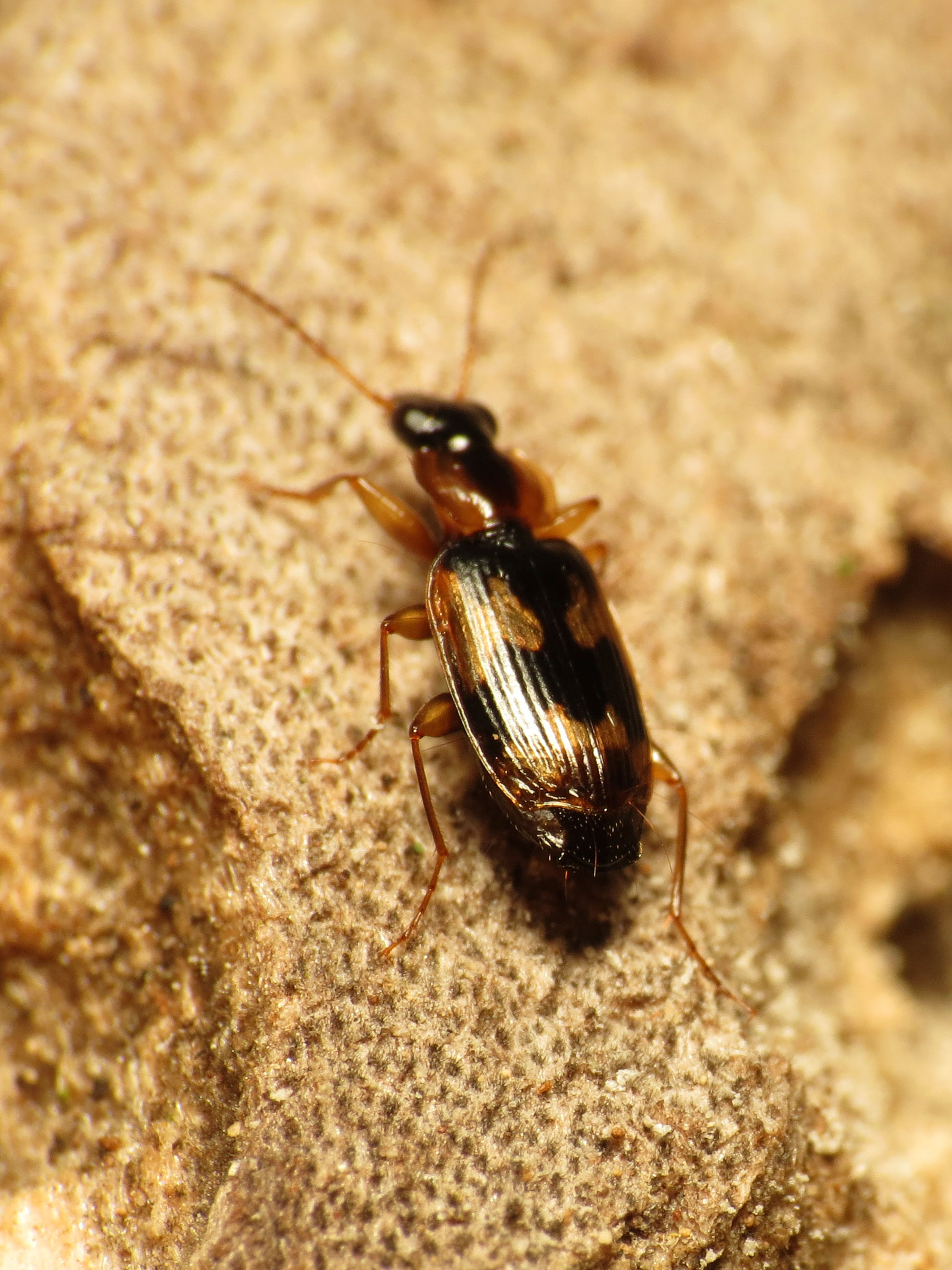

Scientific classification
- Kingdom: Animalia
- Phylum: Arthropoda
- Class: Insecta
- Order: Coleoptera
- Suborder: Adephaga
- Family: Carabidae
- Genus: Phloeoxena
- Species: P. signata

Binomial name
- Phloeoxena signata (Dejean, 1825)

= Phloeoxena signata =

Species of beetle

Phloeoxena signata is a species of ground beetle in the family Carabidae. It is found in North America.

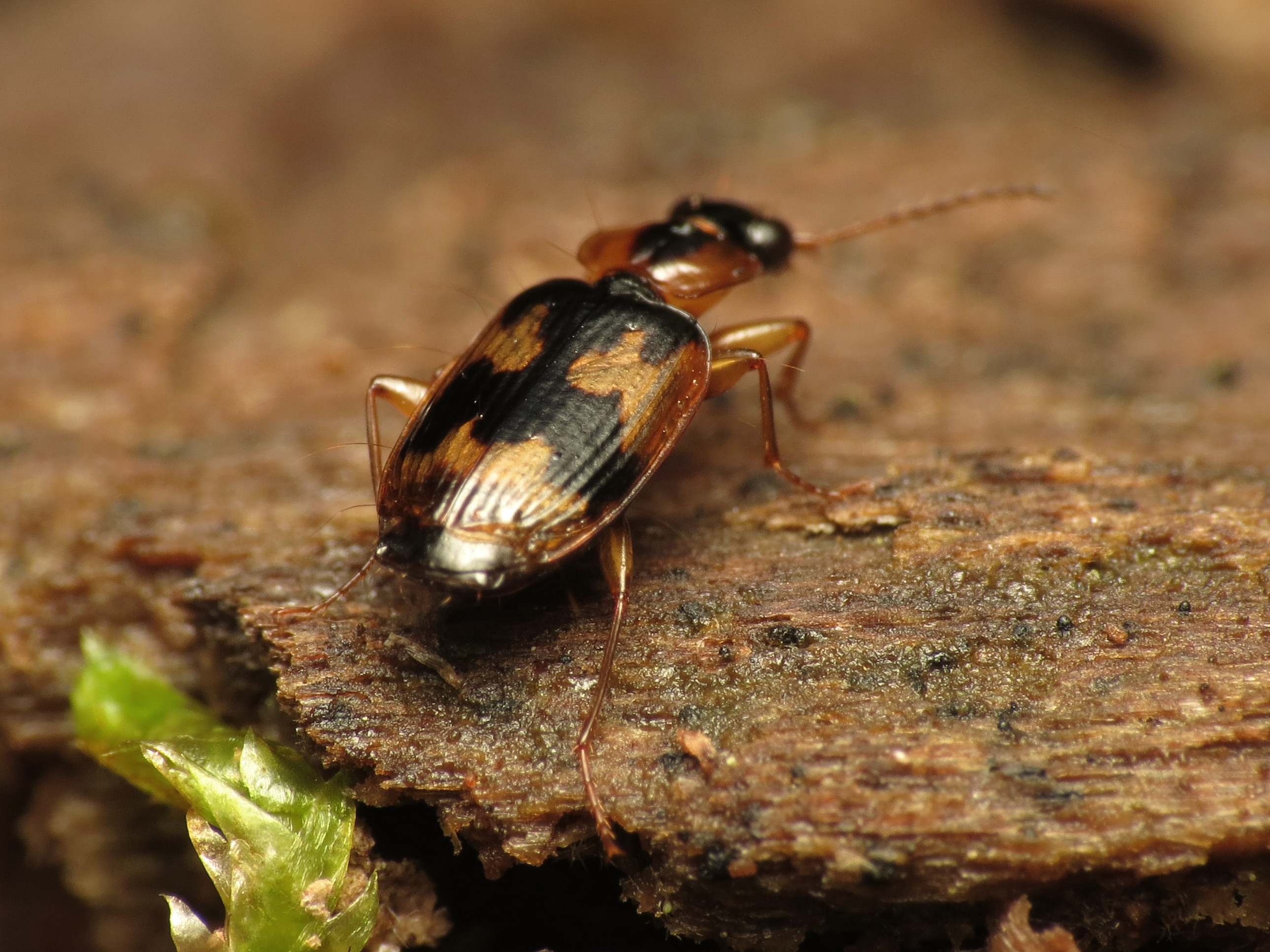

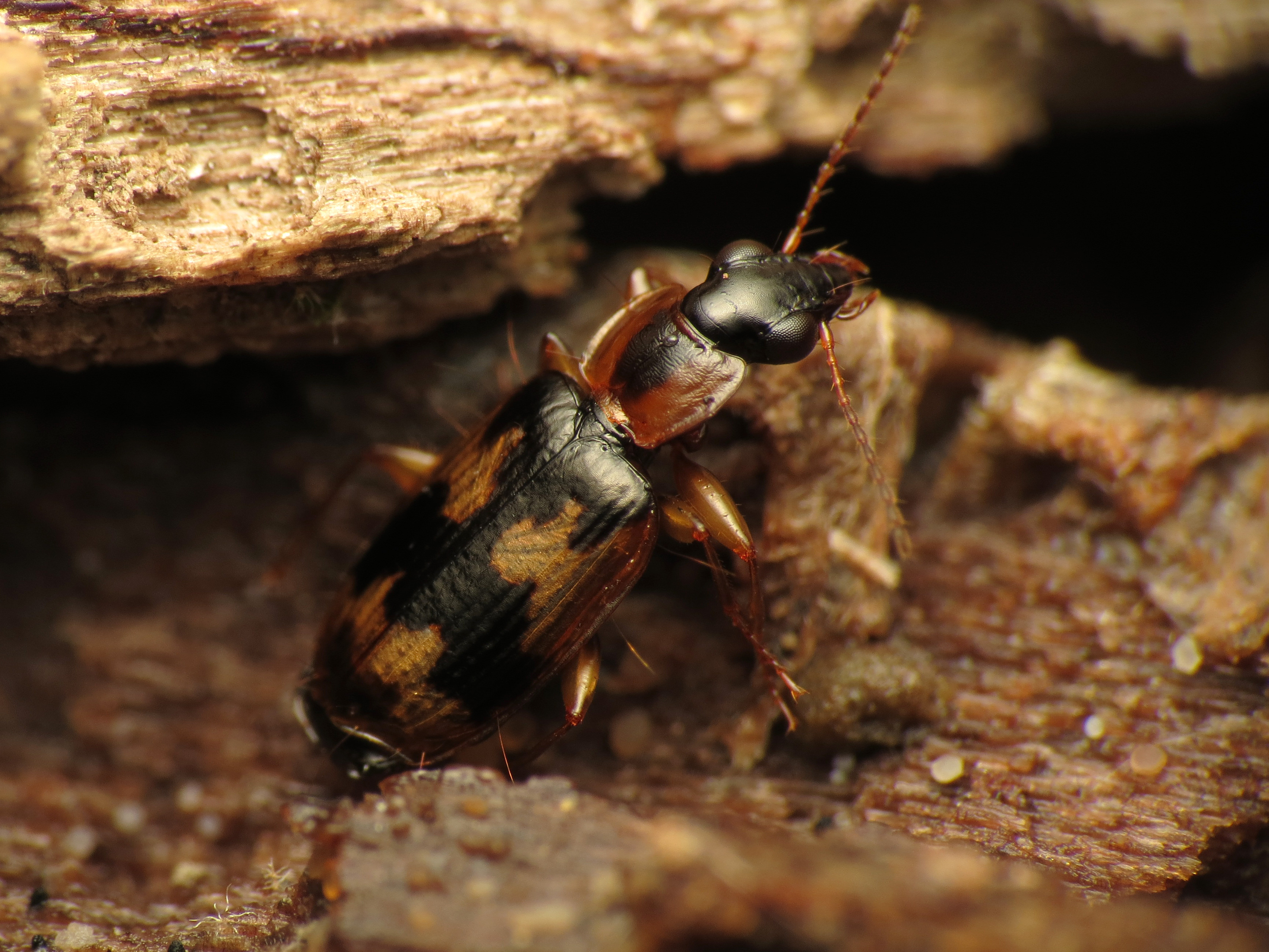
