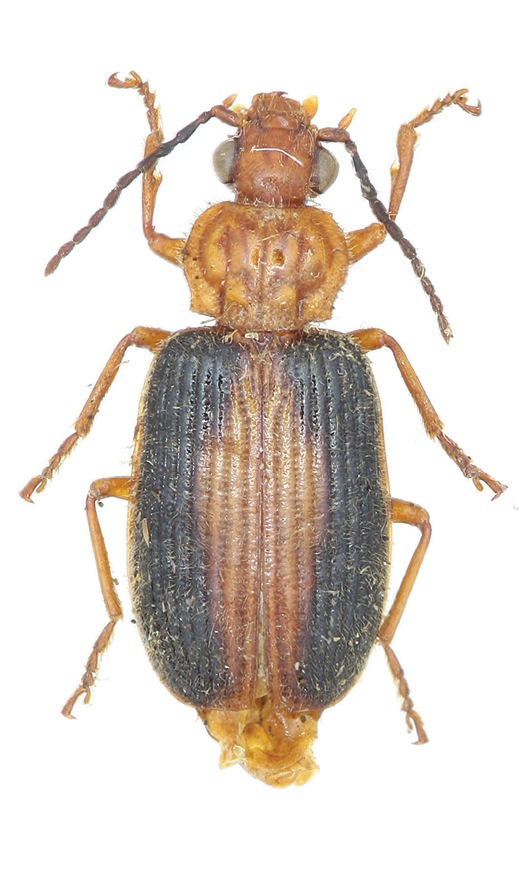
- Dasiosoma bellum

Scientific classification
- Domain: Eukaryota
- Kingdom: Animalia
- Phylum: Arthropoda
- Class: Insecta
- Order: Coleoptera
- Suborder: Adephaga
- Family: Carabidae
- Subfamily: Lebiinae
- Tribe: Lebiini
- Subtribe: Physoderina
- Genus: Dasiosoma; Britton, 1937
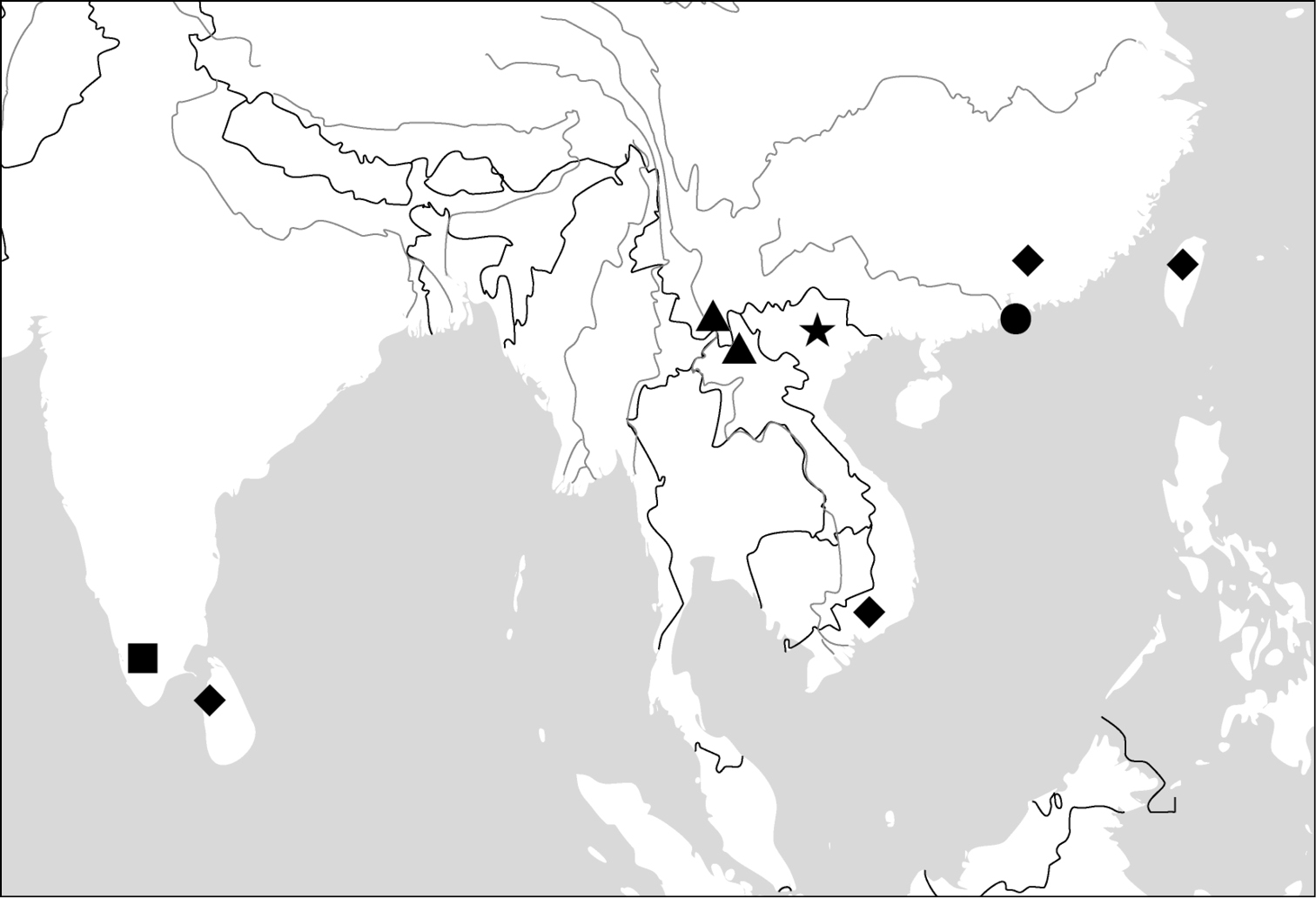
- ● Dasiosoma hirsutum ★ Dasiosoma maindroni ▲ Dasiosoma quadraticolle ◆ Dasiosoma bellum ■ Dasiosoma indicum

Synonyms
- Teradaia Habu, 1979

= Dasiosoma =

Genus of beetles

Dasiosoma is a genus in the beetle family Carabidae. There are about 10 described species in Dasiosoma.

== Species ==
These 10 species belong to the genus Dasiosoma:

- Dasiosoma ariandae Anichtchenko, 2015 (Sri Lanka and India)
- Dasiosoma basilewskyi Shi & Liang, 2013 (Democratic Republic of the Congo)
- Dasiosoma bellum (Habu, 1979) (China and Taiwan)
- Dasiosoma hirsutum (Bates, 1873) (China and Japan)
- Dasiosoma indicum (Kirschenhofer, 2011) (India)
- Dasiosoma ivorense Basilewsky, 1968 (Ivory Coast)
- Dasiosoma maindroni (Tian & Deuve, 2001) (Vietnam)
- Dasiosoma quadraticolle Shi & Liang, 2013 (China and Laos)
- Dasiosoma sudanicum Basilewsky, 1949 (Sudan and Democratic Republic of the Congo)
- Dasiosoma testaceum Britton, 1937 (Zambia and South Africa)
