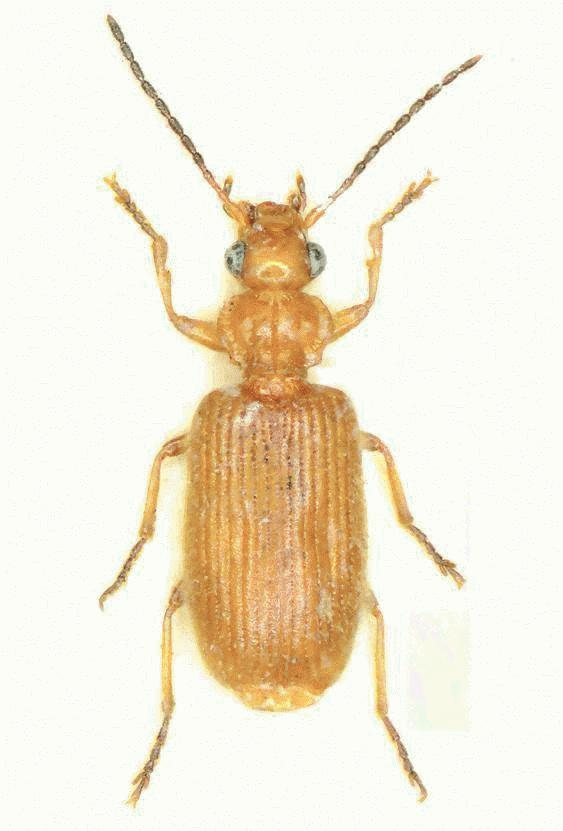

Scientific classification
- Kingdom: Animalia
- Phylum: Arthropoda
- Class: Insecta
- Order: Coleoptera
- Suborder: Adephaga
- Family: Carabidae
- Genus: Dasiosoma
- Species: D. testaceum

Binomial name
- Dasiosoma testaceum Britton, 1937

= Dasiosoma testaceum =

Species of beetle

Dasiosoma testaceum is a species of brown coloured ground beetle in the Lebiinae subfamily that is endemic to Zimbabwe.
