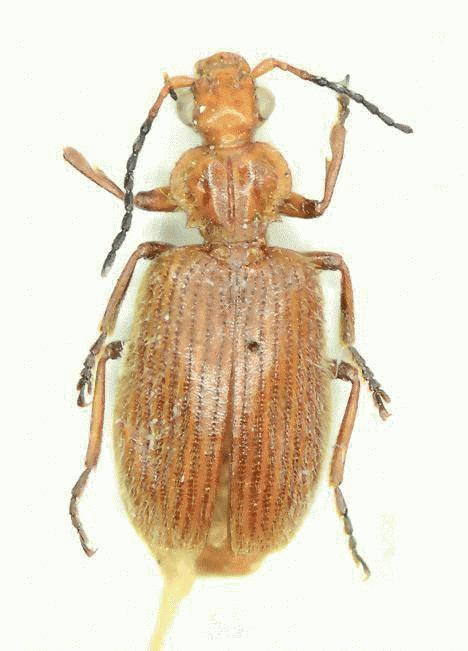

Scientific classification
- Kingdom: Animalia
- Phylum: Arthropoda
- Class: Insecta
- Order: Coleoptera
- Suborder: Adephaga
- Family: Carabidae
- Genus: Dasiosoma
- Species: D. basilewskyi

Binomial name
- Dasiosoma basilewskyi Shi & Liang, 2013

Synonyms
- Dasiosoma hirsutum Basilewsky, 1949 (nec (Bates, 1873))

= Dasiosoma basilewskyi =

Species of beetle

Dasiosoma basilewskyi is a species of brown coloured ground beetle in the Lebiinae subfamily that is endemic to Democratic Republic of the Congo. It is 6.9 millimetres (0.27 in) in length.
