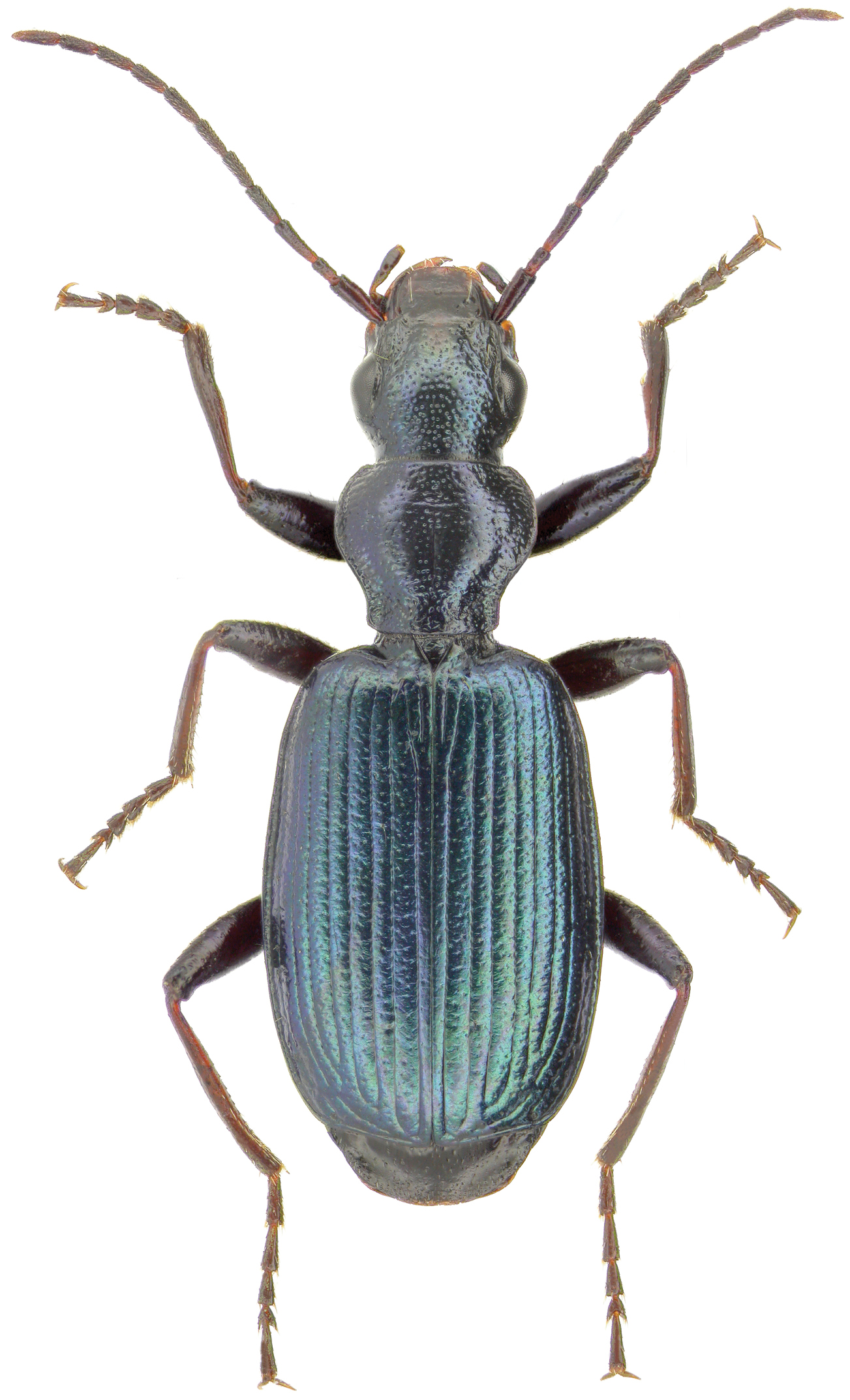
- Tecnophilus croceicollis

Scientific classification
- Kingdom: Animalia
- Phylum: Arthropoda
- Class: Insecta
- Order: Coleoptera
- Suborder: Adephaga
- Family: Carabidae
- Subtribe: Calleidina
- Genus: Tecnophilus; Chaudoir, 1877

= Tecnophilus =

Genus of beetles

Tecnophilus is a genus of beetles in the family Carabidae, containing the following species:

- Tecnophilus croceicollis (Menetries, 1843)
- Tecnophilus pilatei Chaudoir, 1877
