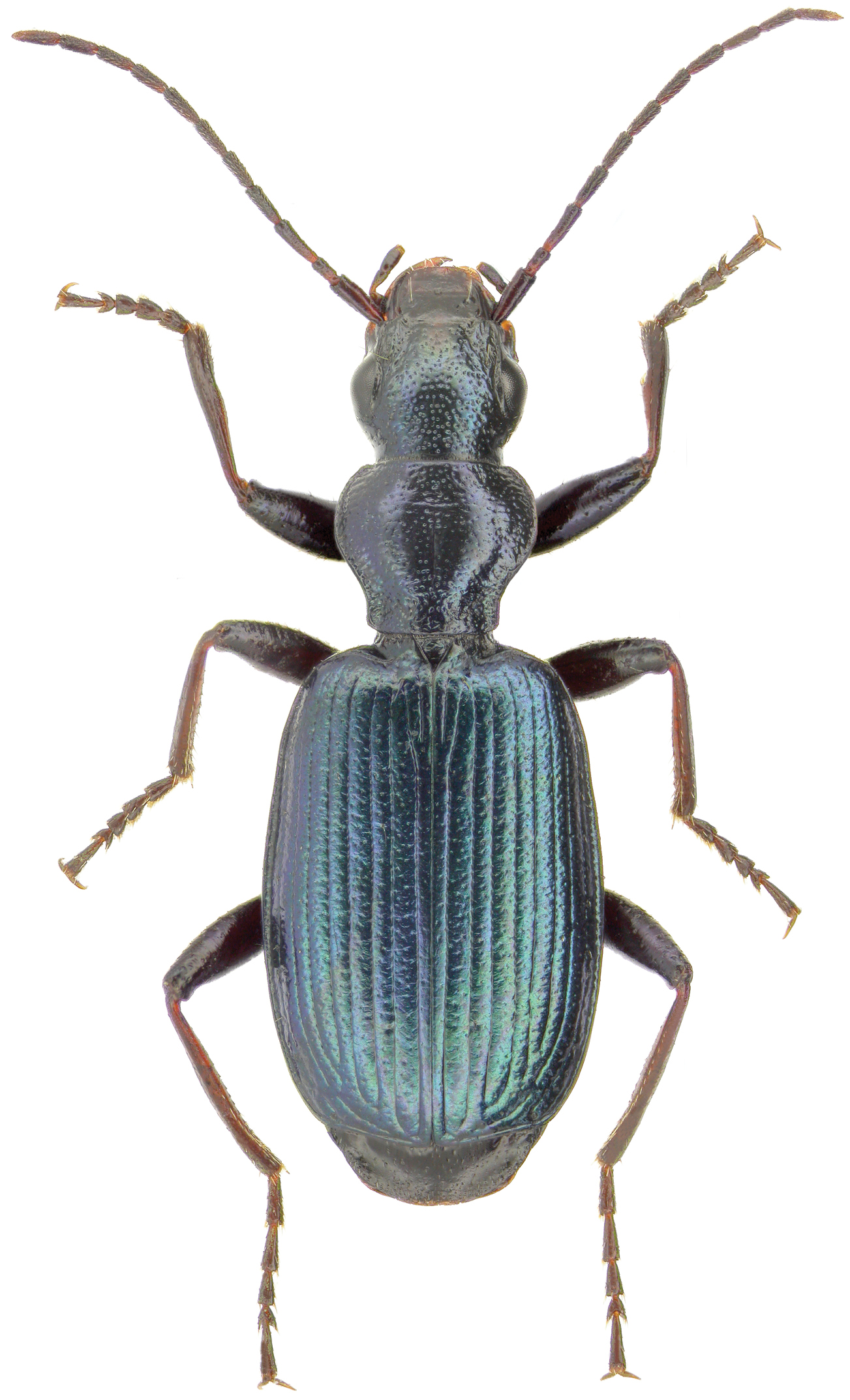
- adult Tecnophilus croceicollis peigani Larson.

Scientific classification
- Domain: Eukaryota
- Kingdom: Animalia
- Phylum: Arthropoda
- Class: Insecta
- Order: Coleoptera
- Suborder: Adephaga
- Family: Carabidae
- Genus: Tecnophilus
- Species: T. croceicollis

Binomial name
- Tecnophilus croceicollis (Ménétriés, 1843)

= Tecnophilus croceicollis =

Species of beetle

Tecnophilus croceicollis is a species of ground beetle in the family Carabidae. It is found in Central America and North America.

== Subspecies ==
These two subspecies belong to the species Tecnophilus croceicollis:

- Tecnophilus croceicollis croceicollis (Ménétriés, 1843)
- Tecnophilus croceicollis peigani Larson, 1969
