= Thoasia surinamensis =

Scientific classification
- Domain: Eukaryota
- Kingdom: Animalia
- Phylum: Arthropoda
- Class: Insecta
- Order: Coleoptera
- Suborder: Adephaga
- Family: Carabidae
- Subfamily: Lebiinae
- Tribe: Lebiini
- Subtribe: Agrina
- Genus: Thoasia
- Species: T. surinamensis

Binomial name
- Thoasia surinamensis Erwin & Aldebron, 2018

Species of beetle

Thoasia surinamensis, the Suriname pentagonal arboreal carabid, is a species of beetle in the family Carabidae. It is found in Suriname.

== Description ==
They are macropterous and capable of flight. Standard body length is 4.12 mm. Elytra shiny olivaceous. Forebody and head also shiny. Pronotum moderately narrow. Abdomen Sparsely setiferous.
