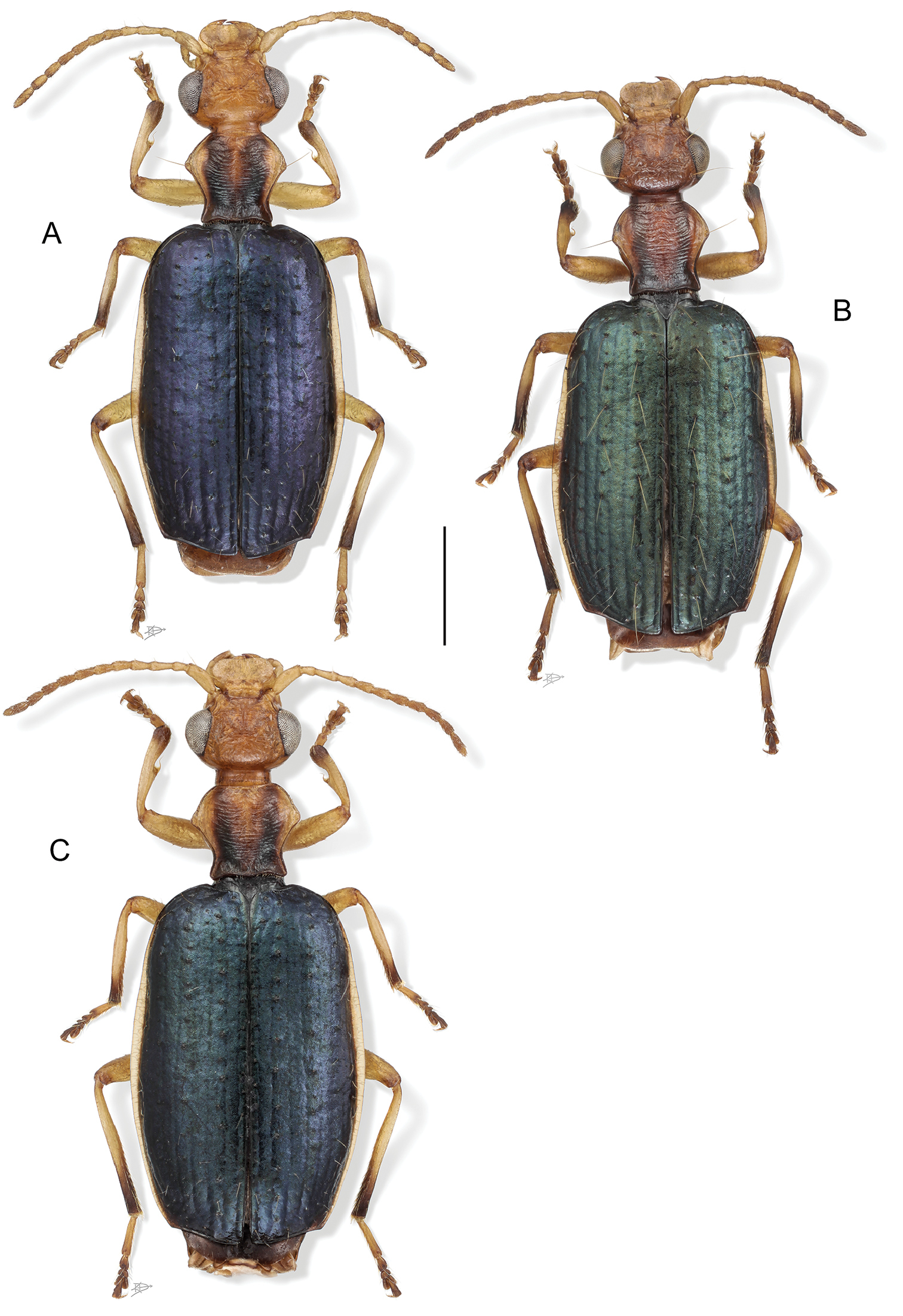
- Thoasia sp.

Scientific classification
- Kingdom: Animalia
- Phylum: Arthropoda
- Class: Insecta
- Order: Coleoptera
- Suborder: Adephaga
- Family: Carabidae
- Subfamily: Lebiinae
- Tribe: Lebiini
- Subtribe: Agrina
- Genus: Thoasia; Liebke, 1939

= Thoasia =

Genus of beetles

Thoasia is a genus of beetle in the family Carabidae. It was once classified as a monotypic genus with the species Thoasia rugifrons, however recently three new species were found.

== Species ==
- Thoasia manu Erwin & Aldebron, 2018 - Ecuador, Perú
- Thoasia pterosmaragdos Aldebron & Erwin, 2018 - French Guiana.
- Thoasia rugifrons Liebke, 1939 - French Guiana, Venezuela, Colombia.
- Thoasia surinamensis Erwin & Aldebron, 2018 - Suriname.
