= Thoasia rugifrons =

Scientific classification
- Domain: Eukaryota
- Kingdom: Animalia
- Phylum: Arthropoda
- Class: Insecta
- Order: Coleoptera
- Suborder: Adephaga
- Family: Carabidae
- Subfamily: Lebiinae
- Tribe: Lebiini
- Subtribe: Agrina
- Genus: Thoasia
- Species: T. rugifrons

Binomial name
- Thoasia rugifrons Liebke, 1939

Species of beetle

Thoasia rugifrons, the rough-headed pentagonal arboreal carabid, is a species of beetle in the family Carabidae. It is found in Colombia, Venezuela, and in the lowlands of French Guiana.

== Description ==
They are macropterous and capable of flight. Standard body length is 4.11–4.16 mm. Elytra shiny metallic. Forebody and head also shiny. Pronotum moderately narrow. Abdomen Sparsely setiferous.
