= Thoasia pterosmaragdos =

Scientific classification
- Domain: Eukaryota
- Kingdom: Animalia
- Phylum: Arthropoda
- Class: Insecta
- Order: Coleoptera
- Suborder: Adephaga
- Family: Carabidae
- Subfamily: Lebiinae
- Tribe: Lebiini
- Subtribe: Agrina
- Genus: Thoasia
- Species: T. pterosmaragdos

Binomial name
- Thoasia pterosmaragdos Aldebron & Erwin, 2018

Species of beetle

Thoasia pterosmaragdos, the emerald-winged pentagonal arboreal carabid, is a species of beetle in the family Carabidae. It is found in French Guiana.

== Description ==
They are macropterous and capable of flight. Standard body length is 4.21–4.39 mm. Elytra entirely metallic dark emerald shiny. Pronotum moderately narrow. Abdomen Sparsely setiferous.
