= Thoasia manu =

Scientific classification
- Domain: Eukaryota
- Kingdom: Animalia
- Phylum: Arthropoda
- Class: Insecta
- Order: Coleoptera
- Suborder: Adephaga
- Family: Carabidae
- Subfamily: Lebiinae
- Tribe: Lebiini
- Subtribe: Agrina
- Genus: Thoasia
- Species: T. manu

Binomial name
- Thoasia manu Erwin & Aldebron, 2018

Species of beetle

Thoasia manu, the Río Manú pentagonal arboreal carabid, is a species of beetle in the family Carabidae. It is found in Amazonian lowlands, Perú and Yasuní region of Ecuador.

== Description ==
They are macropterous and capable of flight. Standard body length is 3.91–4.77 mm. Elytra entirely metallic blue. Forebody and head shiny flavous. Pronotum moderately narrow. Abdomen Sparsely setiferous.
