= Thyreopterus angusticollis =

Scientific classification
- Kingdom: Animalia
- Phylum: Arthropoda
- Class: Insecta
- Order: Coleoptera
- Suborder: Adephaga
- Family: Carabidae
- Genus: Thyreopterus
- Species: T. angusticollis

Binomial name
- Thyreopterus angusticollis Péringuey, 1904

Species of beetle

Thyreopterus angusticollis is a species of ground beetle in the family Carabidae described by entomologist Louis Péringuey in 1904. It belongs to the genus Thyreopterus.
