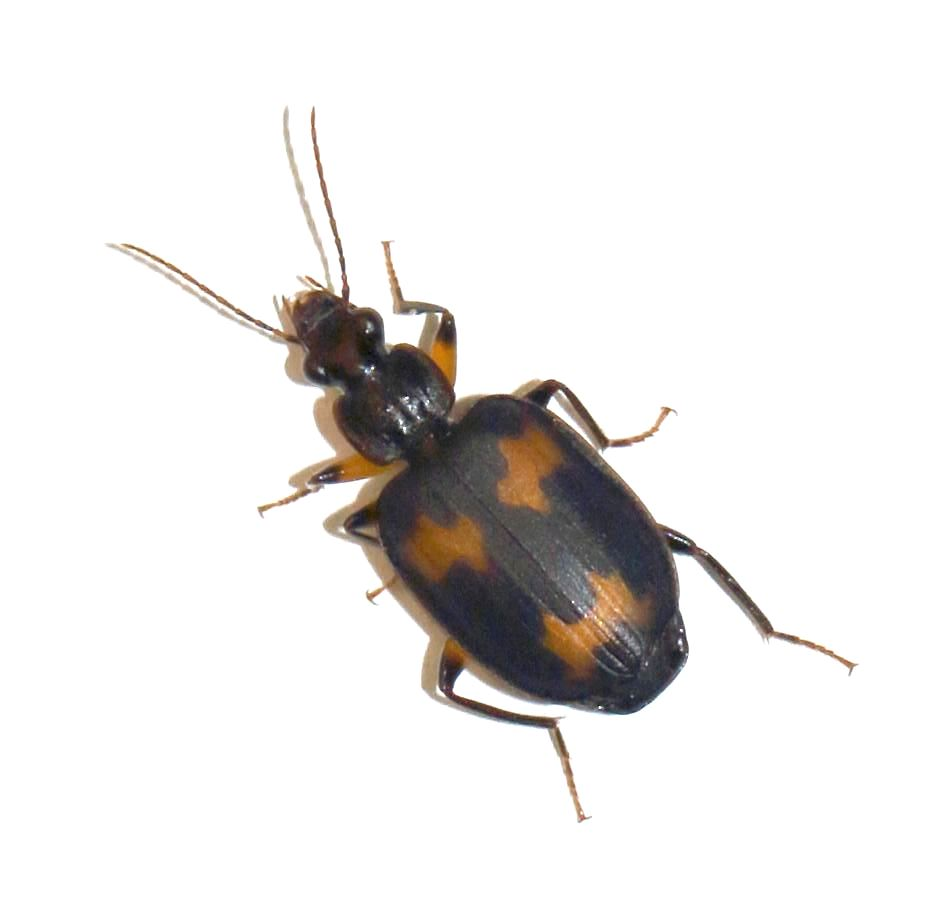
- Thyreopterus flavosignatus, South Africa

Scientific classification
- Kingdom: Animalia
- Phylum: Arthropoda
- Class: Insecta
- Order: Coleoptera
- Suborder: Adephaga
- Family: Carabidae
- Subfamily: Lebiinae
- Tribe: Lebiini
- Subtribe: Pericalina
- Genus: Thyreopterus; Dejean, 1831

Subgenera
- Selenoritus Alluaud, 1917; Thyreopterinus Alluaud, 1932; Thyreopterus Dejean, 1831

= Thyreopterus =

Genus of beetles

Thyreopterus is a genus of in the beetle family Carabidae. There are more than 30 described species in Thyreopterus, found in Africa.

== Species ==
These 31 species belong to the genus Thyreopterus:

- Thyreopterus angusticollis Péringuey, 1904
- Thyreopterus ardoini (Basilewsky, 1961)
- Thyreopterus bifasciatus (Hope, 1842)
- Thyreopterus bilunatus Burgeon, 1933
- Thyreopterus caliginosus (Basilewsky, 1957)
- Thyreopterus chirindanus Basilewsky, 1955
- Thyreopterus collarti (Alluaud, 1932)
- Thyreopterus decellei (Basilewsky, 1963)
- Thyreopterus effugiens Basilewsky, 1968
- Thyreopterus flavosignatus Dejean, 1831
- Thyreopterus kaboboanus Basilewsky, 1960
- Thyreopterus kivuanus Basilewsky, 1960
- Thyreopterus latipennis (Alluaud, 1932)
- Thyreopterus lepesmei Burgeon, 1942
- Thyreopterus letestui Alluaud, 1932
- Thyreopterus limbatus Boheman, 1848
- Thyreopterus lusingae (Basilewsky, 1953)
- Thyreopterus luteicornis Chaudoir, 1870
- Thyreopterus maculatus Chaudoir, 1837
- Thyreopterus mediomaculatus (Burgeon, 1933)
- Thyreopterus orbicollis Burgeon, 1942
- Thyreopterus overlaeti Burgeon, 1937
- Thyreopterus plesius (Alluaud, 1932)
- Thyreopterus posticalis Alluaud, 1932
- Thyreopterus ptolemaei (Alluaud, 1917)
- Thyreopterus quadrilunatus Burgeon, 1933
- Thyreopterus rugicollis (Basilewsky, 1951)
- Thyreopterus spinipennis Alluaud, 1917
- Thyreopterus uelensis Burgeon, 1937
- Thyreopterus undulatus Dejean, 1831
- Thyreopterus vaneyeni (Basilewsky, 1949)
