= Mesolestes =

Scientific classification
- Domain: Eukaryota
- Kingdom: Animalia
- Phylum: Arthropoda
- Class: Insecta
- Order: Coleoptera
- Suborder: Adephaga
- Family: Carabidae
- Subfamily: Lebiinae
- Tribe: Lebiini
- Subtribe: Dromiusina
- Genus: Mesolestes; Schatzmayr, 1943

Subgenera
- Mesolestes Schatzmayr, 1943; Mesolestinus Mateu, 1962; Neomesolestes Mateu, 1956; Paramesolestes Mateu, 1965; Pseudomesolestes Mateu, 1956

Genus of beetles

Mesolestes is a genus in the beetle family Carabidae. There are more than 40 described species in Mesolestes.

== Species ==
These 47 species belong to the genus Mesolestes:

- Mesolestes accentifer (Raffray, 1873) (Morocco, Algeria, and Tunisia)
- Mesolestes affinis (Péringuey, 1896) (Africa)
- Mesolestes ambiguus Mateu, 1980 (South Africa)
- Mesolestes ankaratrae (Mateu, 1975) (Madagascar)
- Mesolestes apterus Mateu, 1962 (Tanzania)
- Mesolestes basilewskyi Mateu, 1962 (Africa)
- Mesolestes bilineatus (Basilewsky, 1949) (Somalia)
- Mesolestes brincki (Mateu, 1965) (Namibia)
- Mesolestes brittoni Mateu, 1956 (Saudi Arabia and Yemen)
- Mesolestes brunneipes (Mateu, 1980) (South Africa)
- Mesolestes caecus (Antoine, 1941) (Morocco)
- Mesolestes descarpentriesi (Mateu, 1975) (Madagascar)
- Mesolestes figuratus (Chaudoir, 1876) (Ethiopia)
- Mesolestes flavescens (Chaudoir, 1876) (Chad)
- Mesolestes flavosignatus (Boheman, 1848) (Africa)
- Mesolestes fraterculus (Chaudoir, 1876) (Ethiopia)
- Mesolestes fusculus (Péringuey, 1896) (Angola and South Africa)
- Mesolestes fuscus Mateu, 1956 (Libya and Lebanon)
- Mesolestes humeralis (Jeannel, 1949) (Madagascar)
- Mesolestes innoshimae (Habu, 1974) (China and Japan)
- Mesolestes katanganus (Mateu, 1967) (Democratic Republic of the Congo)
- Mesolestes kilimanus (Alluaud, 1917) (Tanzania)
- Mesolestes laevis (Mateu, 1980) (South Africa)
- Mesolestes leleupi (Mateu, 1962) (Tanzania)
- Mesolestes machadoi Mateu, 1965 (Angola, Namibia, and South Africa)
- Mesolestes maculatus Mateu, 1960 (Kenya and Tanzania)
- Mesolestes madecassus (Mateu, 1960) (Madagascar)
- Mesolestes meridionalis Mateu, 1965 (Namibia)
- Mesolestes mirus (Mateu, 1980) (South Africa)
- Mesolestes niger Felix, 2017 (Yemen and Soqotra)
- Mesolestes nigrocephalus Mateu, 1962 (Tanzania)
- Mesolestes orinodromus (Alluaud, 1917) (Kenya)
- Mesolestes orophilus (Mateu, 1960) (Cameroon)
- Mesolestes promontorii (Péringuey, 1898) (South Africa)
- Mesolestes pueli (Antoine, 1923) (Morocco)
- Mesolestes quadriguttatus (Mateu, 1979) (Saudi Arabia)
- Mesolestes relictus (Jeanne, 1985) (Spain)
- Mesolestes rufus (Mateu, 1967) (South Africa)
- Mesolestes scapularis (Dejean, 1830) (Portugal, Spain, Morocco, Algeria, and Tunisia)
- Mesolestes sellatus (Motschulsky, 1855) (Tunisia, Egypt, Israel, and Chad)
- Mesolestes senegalensis Mateu, 1969 (Senegal/Gambia)
- Mesolestes sermeti (Mateu & Colas, 1954) (Spain)
- Mesolestes sicardi (Bedel, 1918) (Morocco)
- Mesolestes silvaticus (Mateu, 1967) (Tanzania)
- Mesolestes striatus Mateu, 1972 (Kenya)
- Mesolestes virgatus (Mateu, 1984) (Kenya)
- Mesolestes vittatus (Mateu, 1979) (India)
