= Mesolestes promontorii =

Scientific classification
- Kingdom: Animalia
- Phylum: Arthropoda
- Class: Insecta
- Order: Coleoptera
- Suborder: Adephaga
- Family: Carabidae
- Subfamily: Lebiinae
- Tribe: Lebiini
- Subtribe: Dromiusina
- Genus: Mesolestes
- Species: M. promontorii

Binomial name
- Mesolestes promontorii (Péringuey, 1898)

Synonyms
- Anthia promontorii

Species of beetle

Mesolestes promontorii is a species in the beetle family Carabidae. It is found in South Africa.
