= Hyboptera auxiliadora =

Scientific classification
- Domain: Eukaryota
- Kingdom: Animalia
- Phylum: Arthropoda
- Class: Insecta
- Order: Coleoptera
- Suborder: Adephaga
- Family: Carabidae
- Genus: Hyboptera
- Species: H. auxiliadora

Binomial name
- Hyboptera auxiliadora Erwin, 2004

Species of beetle

Hyboptera auxiliadora, or Auxiliadora's humped-wing carabid beetle, is a species of ground beetle in the family Carabidae. It is found in Central America and North America.
