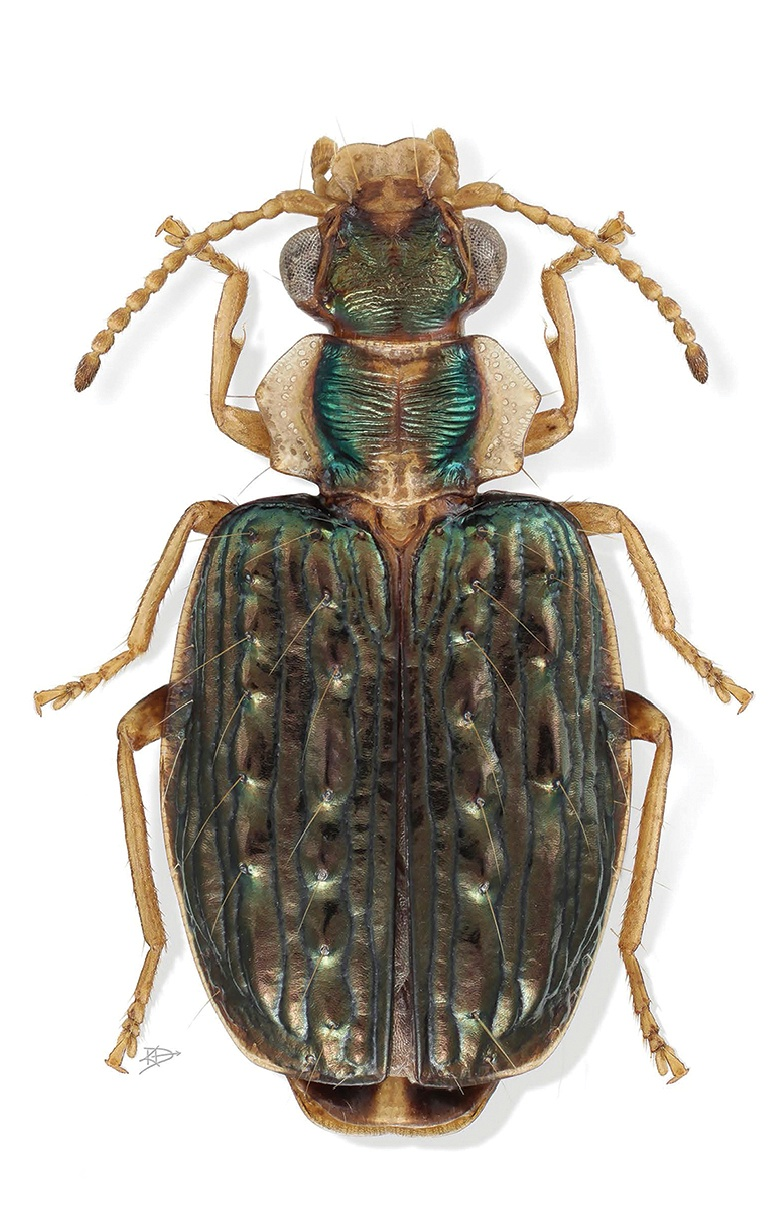
- Hyboptera biolat

Scientific classification
- Domain: Eukaryota
- Kingdom: Animalia
- Phylum: Arthropoda
- Class: Insecta
- Order: Coleoptera
- Suborder: Adephaga
- Family: Carabidae
- Subtribe: Lebiina
- Genus: Hyboptera; Chaudoir, 1872

= Hyboptera =

Genus of beetles

Hyboptera is a genus of ground beetles in the family Carabidae.

== Species ==
Hyboptera contains the following fourteen species:

- Hyboptera angulicollis Chaudoir, 1872
- Hyboptera apollonia Erwin, 2004
- Hyboptera auxiliadora Erwin, 2004
- Hyboptera biolat Erwin & Henry, 2017
- Hyboptera dilutior Oberthür, 1884
- Hyboptera lucida Henry & Erwin, 2017
- Hyboptera scheelea Erwin & Henry, 2017
- Hyboptera shasta Erwin, 2017
- Hyboptera tepui Erwin & Henry, 2017
- Hyboptera tiputini Erwin & Henry, 2017
- Hyboptera tuberculata (Dejean, 1825)
- Hyboptera verrucosa (Reiche, 1842)
- Hyboptera vestiverdis Henry & Erwin, 2017
- Hyboptera viridivittis Chaudoir, 1872
