= Apristus constrictus =

Scientific classification
- Kingdom: Animalia
- Phylum: Arthropoda
- Class: Insecta
- Order: Coleoptera
- Suborder: Adephaga
- Family: Carabidae
- Subfamily: Lebiinae
- Tribe: Lebiini
- Genus: Apristus
- Species: A. constrictus

Binomial name
- Apristus constrictus Casey, 1920

Species of beetle

Apristus constrictus is a species of ground beetle in the family Carabidae. It is found in North America.
