= Apristus =

Scientific classification
- Kingdom: Animalia
- Phylum: Arthropoda
- Class: Insecta
- Order: Coleoptera
- Suborder: Adephaga
- Family: Carabidae
- Tribe: Lebiini
- Genus: Apristus; Chaudoir, 1846

Genus of beetles

Apristus is a genus of beetles in the family Carabidae, containing the following species:

- Apristus actuosus Casey, 1920
- Apristus aeneipennis (Schmidt-Goebel, 1846)
- Apristus aeneomicans Chaudoir, 1850
- Apristus agitatus Casey, 1920
- Apristus aimaki (Jedlicka, 1964)
- Apristus apiceciliatus Mateu, 1991
- Apristus arabicus Mateu, 1986
- Apristus aratus Andrewes, 1932
- Apristus arrowi Jedlicka, 1936
- Apristus baderlei Kirschenhofer, 1988
- Apristus biroi Darlington, 1968
- Apristus boldorii Straneo, 1943
- Apristus brunnescens Kirschenhofer, 1988
- Apristus cephalotus Mateu, 1991
- Apristus chinensis Jedlicka, 1933
- Apristus coiffaiti Mateu, 1980
- Apristus constrictus Casey, 1920
- Apristus cuprascens Bates, 1873
- Apristus cupreus Andrewes, 1924
- Apristus cyanescens Csiki, 1932
- Apristus europaeus Mateu, 1980
- Apristus gracilis Mateu, 1991
- Apristus grandis Andrewes, 1937
- Apristus hololeucus Harold Lindberg, 1950
- Apristus jaechi Kirschenhofer, 1988
- Apristus latens (Leconte, 1848)
- Apristus laticollis Leconte, 1851
- Apristus latipennis Chaudoir, 1878
- Apristus liratus Casey, 1920
- Apristus longulus Bates, 1883
- Apristus louwerensi Andrewes, 1938
- Apristus lucidus Andrewes, 1932
- Apristus mexicanus Bates, 1883
- Apristus miyakei Habu, 1967
- Apristus montanus Mateu, 1983
- Apristus nevadensis Casey, 1920
- Apristus nitens Mateu, 1968
- Apristus peyerimhoffi Mateu, 1956
- Apristus phoebus Andrewes, 1932
- Apristus pugetanus Casey, 1920
- Apristus reticulatus Schaum, 1857
- Apristus rufiscapis Bates, 1873
- Apristus schmidti Kirschenhofer, 1991
- Apristus secticollis Bates, 1873
- Apristus sedlaceki Darlington, 1968
- Apristus sericeus Darlington, 1934
- Apristus spatiosus Andrewes, 1932
- Apristus striatipennis Lucas, 1846
- Apristus striatus (Motschulsky, 1844)
- Apristus subaeneus Chaudoir, 1846
- Apristus subcyaneus G.Horn, 1894
- Apristus subdeletus Casey, 1920
- Apristus subovatus Chaudoir, 1876
- Apristus subsulcatus (Dejean, 1826)
- Apristus subtransparens Motschulsky, 1861
- Apristus thoracicus Casey, 1920
- Apristus transcaspicus Mateu, 1991
- Apristus tropicalis Motschulsky, 1864
- Apristus tuckeri Casey, 1920
- Apristus turkmenicus Kirschenhofer, 1988
