= Apristus latens =

Scientific classification
- Domain: Eukaryota
- Kingdom: Animalia
- Phylum: Arthropoda
- Class: Insecta
- Order: Coleoptera
- Suborder: Adephaga
- Family: Carabidae
- Genus: Apristus
- Species: A. latens

Binomial name
- Apristus latens (LeConte, 1846)

Species of beetle

Apristus latens is a species of ground beetle in the family Carabidae. It is found in North America.
