= Apristus laticollis =

Scientific classification
- Domain: Eukaryota
- Kingdom: Animalia
- Phylum: Arthropoda
- Class: Insecta
- Order: Coleoptera
- Suborder: Adephaga
- Family: Carabidae
- Subfamily: Lebiinae
- Tribe: Lebiini
- Genus: Apristus
- Species: A. laticollis

Binomial name
- Apristus laticollis LeConte, 1851

Species of beetle

Apristus laticollis is a species of ground beetle in the family Carabidae. It is found in North America.
