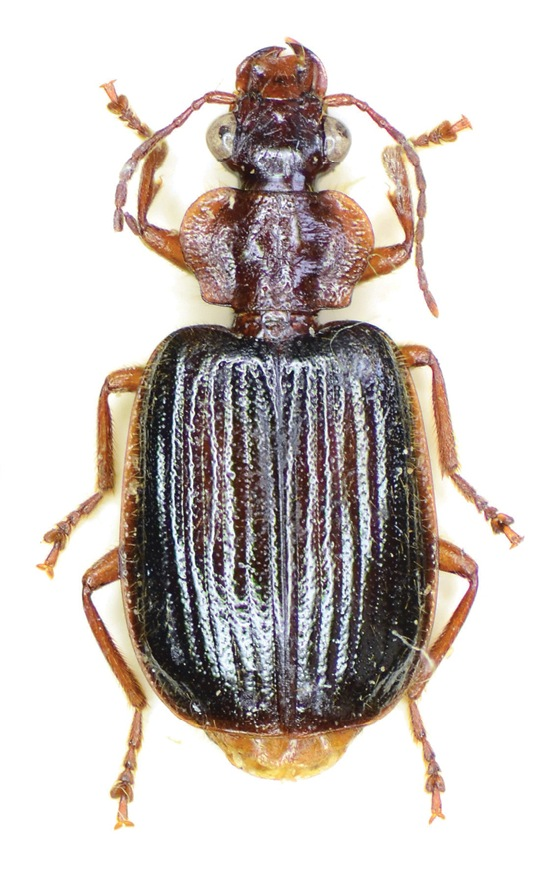
- Orionella kathmanduensis

Scientific classification
- Domain: Eukaryota
- Kingdom: Animalia
- Phylum: Arthropoda
- Class: Insecta
- Order: Coleoptera
- Suborder: Adephaga
- Family: Carabidae
- Subfamily: Lebiinae
- Tribe: Lebiini
- Subtribe: Physoderina
- Genus: Orionella; Jedlicka, 1964

= Orionella =

Genus of beetles

Orionella is a genus in the ground beetle family Carabidae. There are at least three described species in Orionella.

== Species ==
These three species belong to the genus Orionella:

- Orionella discoidalis (Bates, 1892) (China, Myanmar, Philippines)
- Orionella kathmanduensis (Kirschenhofer, 1994) (Nepal)
- Orionella lewisii (Bates, 1873) (China, South Korea, Japan)
