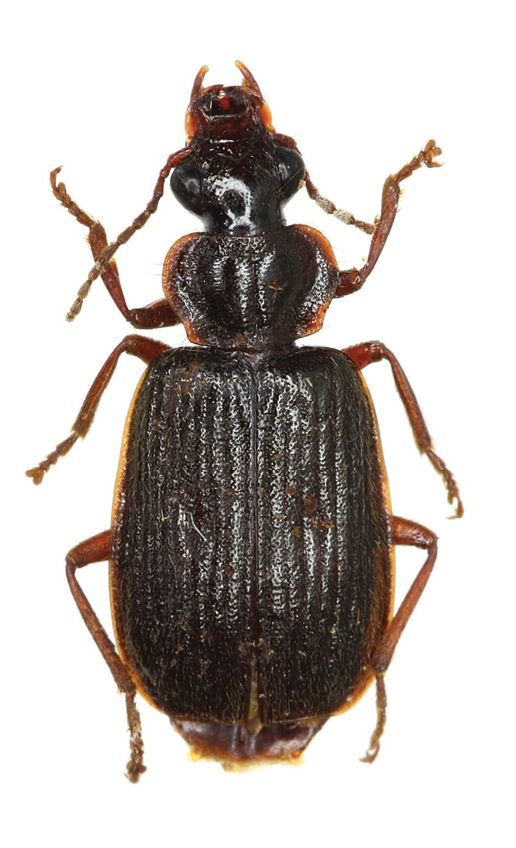
- Orionella lewisii

Scientific classification
- Kingdom: Animalia
- Phylum: Arthropoda
- Class: Insecta
- Order: Coleoptera
- Suborder: Adephaga
- Family: Carabidae
- Genus: Orionella
- Species: O. lewisii

Binomial name
- Orionella lewisii (Bates, 1873)

= Orionella lewisii =

Species of beetle

Orionella lewisii is a species of beetle in the family Carabidae.
