= Metadromius =

Scientific classification
- Domain: Eukaryota
- Kingdom: Animalia
- Phylum: Arthropoda
- Class: Insecta
- Order: Coleoptera
- Suborder: Adephaga
- Family: Carabidae
- Subfamily: Lebiinae
- Tribe: Lebiini
- Subtribe: Dromiusina
- Genus: Metadromius; Bedel, 1907

Genus of beetles

Metadromius is a genus in the beetle family Carabidae. There are at least 30 described species in Metadromius.

== Species ==
These 30 species belong to the genus Metadromius:

- Metadromius accipiter Mateu, 1978
- Metadromius anamurensis Jedlicka, 1965
- Metadromius angularis (Schmidt-Goebel, 1846)
- Metadromius arabicus Mateu, 1979
- Metadromius besucheti Mateu, 1986
- Metadromius brittoni (Basilewsky, 1948)
- Metadromius brunneus Mateu, 1962
- Metadromius carmelitanus Mateu, 1982
- Metadromius circumdatus Mateu, 1986
- Metadromius coiffaiti Mateu, 1990
- Metadromius desaegeri (Basilewsky, 1962)
- Metadromius ephippiatus (Fairmaire, 1884)
- Metadromius ephippiger (Andrewes, 1932)
- Metadromius hebes Mateu, 1986
- Metadromius indicus Mateu, 1978
- Metadromius lateplagiatus (Fairmaire, 1873)
- Metadromius loebli Mateu, 1986
- Metadromius machadoi Mateu, 1962
- Metadromius malawianus Mateu, 1986
- Metadromius myrmidon (Fairmaire, 1859)
- Metadromius nanus (A.Fiori, 1914)
- Metadromius palmi Machado, 1992
- Metadromius pervenustus (Wollaston, 1864)
- Metadromius ramburii (Piochard de la Brûlerie, 1868)
- Metadromius royi Mateu, 1969
- Metadromius rufus Mateu, 1962
- Metadromius signifer (Reitter, 1884)
- Metadromius somalicus Mateu, 1986
- Metadromius suturalis Mateu, 1962
- Metadromius transvaalensis Mateu, 1986
