= Metadromius accipiter =

Scientific classification
- Kingdom: Animalia
- Phylum: Arthropoda
- Clade: Pancrustacea
- Class: Insecta
- Order: Coleoptera
- Suborder: Adephaga
- Family: Carabidae
- Genus: Metadromius
- Species: M. accipiter

Binomial name
- Metadromius accipiter Lorenz, W., 2021

Species of beetle

Metadromius accipiter is a species in the beetle family Carabidae described in 1978.
