= Eucheila =

Scientific classification
- Kingdom: Animalia
- Phylum: Arthropoda
- Class: Insecta
- Order: Coleoptera
- Suborder: Adephaga
- Family: Carabidae
- Tribe: Lebiini
- Genus: Eucheila; Dejean, 1829

Genus of beetles

Eucheila is a genus of beetles in the family Carabidae, containing the following species:

- Eucheila adisi Ball & Shpeley, 1983
- Eucheila atrata (Dejean, 1831)
- Eucheila boliviana (Mateu, 1989)
- Eucheila boyeri (Solier, 1835)
- Eucheila breviformis (Chaudoir, 1872)
- Eucheila cordova Ball & Shpeley, 1983
- Eucheila costulata (Chaudoir, 1872)
- Eucheila erwini Shpeley & Ball, 2000
- Eucheila flavilabris Dejean & Boisduval, 1829
- Eucheila inpa (Ball & Shpeley, 1983)
- Eucheila kiplingi Shpeley & Ball, 2000
- Eucheila lucida (Mateu, 1989)
- Eucheila marginata Shpeley & Ball, 2000
- Eucheila mateui Shpeley & Ball, 2000
- Eucheila megala (Reichardt, 1966)
- Eucheila mirifica Anichtchenko, 2009
- Eucheila nevermanni (Liebke, 1929)
- Eucheila palpalis (Ball & Shpeley, 1983)
- Eucheila pilosa Shpeley & Ball, 2000
- Eucheila planipennis (Bates, 1891)
- Eucheila purpurea (Ball & Shpeley, 1983)
- Eucheila reichardti (Ball & Shpeley, 1983)
- Eucheila splendens (Ball & Shpeley, 1983)
- Eucheila strandi (Liebke, 1939)
- Eucheila surinamensis Shpeley & Ball, 2000
