= Eucheila boyeri =

Scientific classification
- Domain: Eukaryota
- Kingdom: Animalia
- Phylum: Arthropoda
- Class: Insecta
- Order: Coleoptera
- Suborder: Adephaga
- Family: Carabidae
- Genus: Eucheila
- Species: E. boyeri

Binomial name
- Eucheila boyeri (Solier, 1835)

Synonyms
- Inna texana Schaeffer, 1910

Species of beetle

Eucheila boyeri is a species of ground beetle in the family Carabidae. It is found in the Caribbean Sea, Central America, North America, and South America.
