= Philophuga viridicollis =

Scientific classification
- Kingdom: Animalia
- Phylum: Arthropoda
- Class: Insecta
- Order: Coleoptera
- Suborder: Adephaga
- Family: Carabidae
- Genus: Philophuga
- Species: P. viridicollis

Binomial name
- Philophuga viridicollis (LeConte, 1846)

Species of beetle

Philophuga viridicollis is a species of ground beetle in the family Carabidae. It is found in Central America and North America.
