= Philophuga =

Scientific classification
- Kingdom: Animalia
- Phylum: Arthropoda
- Class: Insecta
- Order: Coleoptera
- Suborder: Adephaga
- Family: Carabidae
- Subtribe: Calleidina
- Genus: Philophuga; Motschulsky, 1859

Genus of beetles

Philophuga is a genus of ground beetles in the family Carabidae. There are about five described species in Philophuga.

== Species ==
These five species belong to the genus Philophuga:

- Philophuga amoena LeConte, 1848
- Philophuga brachinoides Bates, 1883
- Philophuga caerulea Casey, 1913
- Philophuga viridicollis (LeConte, 1846)
- Philophuga viridis (Dejean, 1831)
