= Philophuga caerulea =

Scientific classification
- Kingdom: Animalia
- Phylum: Arthropoda
- Class: Insecta
- Order: Coleoptera
- Suborder: Adephaga
- Family: Carabidae
- Genus: Philophuga
- Species: P. caerulea

Binomial name
- Philophuga caerulea Casey, 1913

Species of beetle

Philophuga caerulea is a species of ground beetle in the family Carabidae. It is found in Central America and North America.
