= Philophuga viridis =

Scientific classification
- Kingdom: Animalia
- Phylum: Arthropoda
- Class: Insecta
- Order: Coleoptera
- Suborder: Adephaga
- Family: Carabidae
- Genus: Philophuga
- Species: P. viridis

Binomial name
- Philophuga viridis (Dejean, 1831)

Species of beetle

Philophuga viridis is a species of ground beetle in the family Carabidae. It is found in North America.

== Subspecies ==
These four subspecies belong to the species Philophuga viridis:

- Philophuga viridis amoena (LeConte, 1846)
- Philophuga viridis horni Chaudoir, 1877
- Philophuga viridis klamathea Larson, 1969
- Philophuga viridis viridis (Dejean, 1831)
