= Euproctinus balli =

Scientific classification
- Domain: Eukaryota
- Kingdom: Animalia
- Phylum: Arthropoda
- Class: Insecta
- Order: Coleoptera
- Suborder: Adephaga
- Family: Carabidae
- Genus: Euproctinus
- Species: E. balli

Binomial name
- Euproctinus balli Shpeley, 1986

Species of beetle

Euproctinus balli is a species of ground beetle in the family Carabidae. It is found in North America.
