= Euproctinus abjectus =

Scientific classification
- Domain: Eukaryota
- Kingdom: Animalia
- Phylum: Arthropoda
- Class: Insecta
- Order: Coleoptera
- Suborder: Adephaga
- Family: Carabidae
- Genus: Euproctinus
- Species: E. abjectus

Binomial name
- Euproctinus abjectus (Bates, 1883)

Synonyms
- Euproctinus texanus (Wickham, 1897)

Species of beetle

Euproctinus abjectus is a species of ground beetle in the family Carabidae. It is found in North America.
