= Euproctinus =

Scientific classification
- Kingdom: Animalia
- Phylum: Arthropoda
- Class: Insecta
- Order: Coleoptera
- Suborder: Adephaga
- Family: Carabidae
- Tribe: Lebiini
- Genus: Euproctinus; Leng & Mutchler, 1927

Genus of beetles

Euproctinus is a genus of beetles in the family Carabidae, containing the following species:

- Euproctinus abjectus (Bates, 1883)
- Euproctinus balli Shpeley, 1986
- Euproctinus columbianus Shpeley, 1986
- Euproctinus deliciolus (Bates, 1883)
- Euproctinus fasciatus (Solier, 1849)
- Euproctinus howdeni Shpeley, 1986
- Euproctinus nigrotibialis Shpeley, 1986
- Euproctinus ornatellus (Bates, 1883)
- Euproctinus pallidus Shpeley, 1986
- Euproctinus panamensis Shpeley, 1986
- Euproctinus putzeysi (Chaudoir, 1872)
- Euproctinus quadriplagiatus (Reiche, 1842)
- Euproctinus quadrivittis (Chaudoir, 1872)
- Euproctinus sigillatus (Bates, 1883)
- Euproctinus subdeletus (Bates, 1883)
- Euproctinus trivittatus (Leconte, 1878)
