= List of Clivina species =

This is a list of 646 species in Clivina, a genus of ground beetles in the family Carabidae.

== Clivina species ==
Subgenus Antroforceps Barr, 1967

- Clivina alabama Bousquet, 2012
- Clivina bolivari (Barr, 1967)
- Clivina sasajii Ball, 2001

Subgenus Clivina Latreille, 1802

- Clivina acutimentum Balkenohl, 2021
- Clivina acutipalpis Putzeys, 1877
- Clivina addita Darlington, 1934
- Clivina adstricta Putzeys, 1867
- Clivina aequalis Blackburn, 1890
- Clivina agona Putzeys, 1867
- Clivina agumbea Balkenohl, 2021
- Clivina alleni Baehr, 2015
- Clivina alternans Darlington, 1971
- Clivina amazonica Putzeys, 1861
- Clivina ambigua Baehr, 2015
- Clivina ampandrandavae Basilewsky, 1973
- Clivina angulicollis Baehr, 2015
- Clivina angustipes Putzeys, 1868
- Clivina antennaria Putzeys, 1867
- Clivina anthracina Klug, 1862
- Clivina antoni Balkenohl, 2018
- Clivina apexopaca Balkenohl, 2021
- Clivina apexplana Balkenohl, 2021
- Clivina argenteicola Baehr, 2015
- Clivina armata Putzeys, 1846
- Clivina arnhemensis Baehr, 2015
- Clivina arunachalensis Saha & Biswas, 1985
- Clivina asymmetrica Baehr, 2015
- Clivina athertonensis Baehr, 2015
- Clivina atrata Putzeys, 1861
- Clivina atridorsis Sloane, 1905
- Clivina australasiae Boheman, 1858
- Clivina australica Sloane, 1896
- Clivina bacillaria Bates, 1889
- Clivina balli Baehr, 2015
- Clivina baloghi Baehr, 2015
- Clivina bankae Baehr, 2017
- Clivina banksi Sloane, 1907
- Clivina basalis Chaudoir, 1843
- Clivina bataviae Baehr, 2015
- Clivina batesi Putzeys, 1867
- Clivina bengalensis Putzeys, 1846
- Clivina bicolor Putzeys, 1867
- Clivina bicolorata Baehr, 2015
- Clivina bicornuta Baehr, 2008
- Clivina bidentata Putzeys, 1846
- Clivina bifoveata Putzeys, 1861
- Clivina bifoveifrons Baehr, 2015
- Clivina biguttata Putzeys, 1867
- Clivina bilyi Baehr, 2015
- Clivina bingbong Baehr, 2015
- Clivina biplagiata Putzeys, 1866
- Clivina birdumensis Baehr, 2015
- Clivina biroi Kult, 1951
- Clivina bitincta Sloane, 1905
- Clivina bituberculata Putzeys, 1867
- Clivina blackburni Sloane, 1896
- Clivina boliviensis Putzeys, 1846
- Clivina boops Blackburn, 1890
- Clivina bouchardi Baehr, 2015
- Clivina bovillae Blackburn, 1890
- Clivina bowenensis Baehr, 2008
- Clivina brandti Darlington, 1962
- Clivina breviceps Baehr, 2015
- Clivina brevicollis Putzeys, 1867
- Clivina brevicornis Darlington, 1962
- Clivina brevior Putzeys, 1867
- Clivina brevipennis Baehr, 2015
- Clivina brevisterna Sloane, 1916
- Clivina breviuscula Putzeys, 1867
- Clivina brittoni Baehr, 2015
- Clivina brooksi Baehr, 2015
- Clivina brunnea Putzeys, 1846
- Clivina brunnicolor Sloane, 1916
- Clivina brunnipennis Putzeys, 1846
- Clivina bulirschi Baehr, 2015
- Clivina bullata Andrewes, 1927
- Clivina bunburyana Baehr, 2015
- Clivina burmeisteri Putzeys, 1867
- Clivina cairnsensis Baehr, 2015
- Clivina carbinensis Baehr, 2015
- Clivina carbonaria Putzeys, 1867
- Clivina carinifera Baehr, 2015
- Clivina carnabyi Baehr, 2017
- Clivina carpentaria Sloane, 1896
- Clivina castanea Westwood, 1837
- Clivina cava Putzeys, 1866
- Clivina choatei Bousquet & Skelley, 2012
- Clivina clarencea Baehr, 2015
- Clivina clivinoides (Schmidt-Goebel, 1846)
- Clivina cobourgiana Baehr, 2017
- Clivina cochlearia Baehr, 2015
- Clivina collaris (Herbst, 1784)
- Clivina columbica Putzeys, 1846
- Clivina communis Baehr, 2015
- Clivina confinis Baehr, 2015
- Clivina conicollis Baehr, 2017
- Clivina consanguinea Baehr, 2015
- Clivina consimilis Baehr, 2015
- Clivina convexior Baehr, 2015
- Clivina cooindae Baehr, 2017
- Clivina cooperensis Baehr, 2015
- Clivina coriacea Baehr, 2015
- Clivina coronata Putzeys, 1873
- Clivina corrugata Baehr, 2015
- Clivina coryzoides Baehr, 1989
- Clivina crassidentata Baehr, 2008
- Clivina crassipennis Baehr, 2017
- Clivina crawfordensis Baehr, 2015
- Clivina crenulata Balkenohl, 2021
- Clivina cribricollis Putzeys, 1861
- Clivina cribrifrons Sloane, 1905
- Clivina cribrosa Putzeys, 1868
- Clivina cruciata Putzeys, 1867
- Clivina cruralis Putzeys, 1867
- Clivina csikii Kult, 1951
- Clivina cubae Darlington, 1934
- Clivina cuttacutta Baehr, 2015
- Clivina cylindracea Baehr, 2008
- Clivina cylindriformis Sloane, 1896
- Clivina cylindripennis Sloane, 1905
- Clivina dampieri Sloane, 1916
- Clivina darlingtoni Baehr, 2008
- Clivina darlingtoniana Baehr, 2015
- Clivina darwinensis Baehr, 2015
- Clivina darwini Sloane, 1916
- Clivina dealata Darlington, 1962
- Clivina debilis Blackburn, 1890
- Clivina defaverii Baehr, 2008
- Clivina deleta Darlington, 1962
- Clivina delkeskampi Kult, 1959
- Clivina demarzi Baehr, 1988
- Clivina densepunctata Baehr, 2015
- Clivina densesulcata Baehr, 2008
- Clivina denticollis Sloane, 1896
- Clivina dentifemorata Putzeys, 1846
- Clivina deplanata Putzeys, 1867
- Clivina depressa Kult, 1951
- Clivina depressicollis Baehr, 1989
- Clivina desperata Baehr, 2008
- Clivina difformis Putzeys, 1868
- Clivina diluta Darlington, 1953
- Clivina dilutipes Putzeys, 1868
- Clivina dimidiata Putzeys, 1866
- Clivina dingo Sloane, 1905
- Clivina discrepans Baehr, 2015
- Clivina dissimilis Putzeys, 1846
- Clivina distigma Putzeys, 1867
- Clivina doddi Sloane, 1905
- Clivina dolens Putzeys, 1873
- Clivina dostali Baehr, 2015
- Clivina douglasensis Baehr, 2015
- Clivina drumonti Balkenohl, 2021
- Clivina drysdalea Baehr, 2015
- Clivina dubia Baehr, 2017
- Clivina duboisi Burgeon, 1935
- Clivina edithae Baehr, 2015
- Clivina edungalbae Baehr, 2015
- Clivina elegans Putzeys, 1861
- Clivina elliott Baehr, 2015
- Clivina elongata Chaudoir, 1843
- Clivina elongatula Nietner, 1856
- Clivina emarginata Putzeys, 1868
- Clivina eremicola Blackburn, 1894
- Clivina erugata Darlington, 1962
- Clivina erugatella Darlington, 1962
- Clivina erythropus Putzeys, 1846
- Clivina euphratica Putzeys, 1867
- Clivina excavatifrons Baehr, 2015
- Clivina exilis Sloane, 1916
- Clivina extensicollis Putzeys, 1846
- Clivina ferruginea Putzeys, 1868
- Clivina fessa Darlington, 1962
- Clivina finitima Baehr, 2015
- Clivina flava Putzeys, 1868
- Clivina fluviatilis Baehr, 2015
- Clivina fontisaliceae Baehr, 2008
- Clivina fortis Sloane, 1896
- Clivina fossifrons Putzeys, 1867
- Clivina fossor (Linnaeus, 1758)
- Clivina fossulata Baehr, 2015
- Clivina foveiceps Putzeys, 1846
- Clivina foveifrons Baehr, 2017
- Clivina foveiventris Baehr, 2015
- Clivina frenchi Sloane, 1896
- Clivina froggatti Sloane, 1896
- Clivina frontalis Baehr, 2015
- Clivina fuscicornis Putzeys, 1846
- Clivina fuscipes Putzeys, 1846
- Clivina gamma Andrewes, 1929
- Clivina gemina Baehr, 2017
- Clivina gentilis Baehr, 2015
- Clivina germanni Balkenohl, 2021
- Clivina gerstmeieri Baehr, 1989
- Clivina gilesi Baehr, 2008
- Clivina glabrata Baehr, 2015
- Clivina glabriceps Baehr, 2015
- Clivina glabripennis Baehr, 2017
- Clivina goldingi Baehr, 2017
- Clivina goniostoma Putzeys, 1867
- Clivina gracilipes Sloane, 1896
- Clivina grahami Baehr, 2015
- Clivina grandiceps Sloane, 1896
- Clivina grata Darlington, 1953
- Clivina gressitti Darlington, 1962
- Clivina grossi Baehr, 2008
- Clivina gubarae Baehr, 2015
- Clivina guineensis Kult, 1951
- Clivina gunlomensis Baehr, 2015
- Clivina hackeri Sloane, 1907
- Clivina haeckeli Baehr, 2015
- Clivina hanichi Baehr, 2008
- Clivina hartleyi Baehr, 2015
- Clivina hasenpuschi Baehr, 2015
- Clivina heathlandica Baehr, 2015
- Clivina helferi Putzeys, 1867
- Clivina helmsi Blackburn, 1892
- Clivina helmutbergeri Baehr, 2015
- Clivina hennigi Baehr, 2015
- Clivina heridgei Baehr, 2008
- Clivina heros Baehr, 2017
- Clivina heterogena Putzeys, 1866
- Clivina hilaris Putzeys, 1861
- Clivina hogani Balkenohl, 2021
- Clivina hogenhoutae Baehr, 2015
- Clivina horaki Baehr, 2017
- Clivina horneri Baehr, 2017
- Clivina houstoni Baehr, 2008
- Clivina hovorkai Baehr, 2015
- Clivina howdenorum Baehr, 2015
- Clivina impressefrons LeConte, 1844
- Clivina impressiceps Baehr, 2015
- Clivina impuncticollis Baehr, 2015
- Clivina inaequalifrons Baehr, 1989
- Clivina inaequalis Putzeys, 1867
- Clivina incerta Baehr, 2008
- Clivina incurvicollis Baehr, 2017
- Clivina inermis Baehr, 2015
- Clivina infans Baehr, 2017
- Clivina inopaca Darlington, 1962
- Clivina inopinata Baehr, 2017
- Clivina inops Baehr, 2008
- Clivina integra Andrewes, 1929
- Clivina interioris Baehr, 2008
- Clivina interposita Baehr, 2017
- Clivina intersecta Baehr, 1989
- Clivina isogona Putzeys, 1868
- Clivina jabiruensis Baehr, 2015
- Clivina jakli Baehr, 2015
- Clivina janae Kult, 1959
- Clivina janetae Baehr, 2015
- Clivina javanica Putzeys, 1846
- Clivina jodasi Kult, 1959
- Clivina kakaduana Baehr, 2015
- Clivina kalumburu Baehr, 2015
- Clivina kapuri Kult, 1951
- Clivina karikali Jedlicka, 1964
- Clivina kaszabi Kult, 1951
- Clivina kershawi Sloane, 1916
- Clivina kimberleyana Baehr, 2015
- Clivina komareki Kult, 1951
- Clivina kubor Darlington, 1971
- Clivina kulti Darlington, 1962
- Clivina kununurrae Baehr, 2015
- Clivina laeta Putzeys, 1867
- Clivina laetipes Putzeys, 1867
- Clivina laevicollis Baehr, 2015
- Clivina laevigata Baehr, 2017
- Clivina lamondi Baehr, 2015
- Clivina langeri Baehr, 2015
- Clivina languida Baehr, 2015
- Clivina larrimah Baehr, 2015
- Clivina lata Putzeys, 1867
- Clivina latesulcata Baehr, 2015
- Clivina laticeps Putzeys, 1846
- Clivina latimanus Putzeys, 1846
- Clivina latiuscula Putzeys, 1867
- Clivina leai Sloane, 1896
- Clivina lebasii Putzeys, 1846
- Clivina lepida Putzeys, 1866
- Clivina leptosoma Andrewes, 1938
- Clivina lewisi Andrewes, 1927
- Clivina limbipennis Jacquelin du Val, 1857
- Clivina lincolnensis Baehr, 2008
- Clivina lobata Bonelli, 1813
- Clivina lobifera Baehr, 2015
- Clivina lobipes Sloane, 1896
- Clivina longipennis Putzeys, 1861
- Clivina longissima Baehr, 2015
- Clivina longithorax Baehr, 2008
- Clivina lucernicola Baehr, 2015
- Clivina lucida Putzeys, 1867
- Clivina lutea Baehr, 2015
- Clivina macleayi Sloane, 1896
- Clivina macularis Putzeys, 1867
- Clivina madiganensis Baehr, 2015
- Clivina magnicollis Baehr, 2008
- Clivina mahoni Baehr, 2017
- Clivina major Sloane, 1917
- Clivina mareebae Baehr, 2015
- Clivina marginata (Putzeys, 1868)
- Clivina marginicollis Putzeys, 1867
- Clivina marlgu Baehr, 2015
- Clivina mastersi Sloane, 1896
- Clivina matarankae Baehr, 2015
- Clivina matthewsi Baehr, 2015
- Clivina mcquillani Baehr, 2015
- Clivina media Putzeys, 1846
- Clivina megalops Baehr, 2015
- Clivina mekongensis Lesne, 1896
- Clivina micans Baehr, 2017
- Clivina mickoleiti Baehr, 2015
- Clivina microps Baehr, 2015
- Clivina minilyae Baehr, 2015
- Clivina minuta Baehr, 2015
- Clivina minutissima Baehr, 2015
- Clivina mirrei Kult, 1959
- Clivina misella Sloane, 1905
- Clivina mjoebergi Baehr, 2008
- Clivina mocquerysi Alluaud, 1935
- Clivina moerens Putzeys, 1873
- Clivina molucca Balkenohl, 2021
- Clivina monilicornis Sloane, 1896
- Clivina monteithi Baehr, 2015
- Clivina monticola Andrewes, 1931
- Clivina montisbelli Baehr, 2017
- Clivina montisferrei Baehr, 2015
- Clivina moreheadensis Baehr, 2015
- Clivina moretona Baehr, 2017
- Clivina morosa Baehr, 2008
- Clivina muirellae Baehr, 2015
- Clivina multispinosa Baehr, 2015
- Clivina murgenellae Baehr, 2015
- Clivina mustela Andrewes, 1923
- Clivina myops Bousquet, 1997
- Clivina nadineae Baehr, 2015
- Clivina nana Sloane, 1896
- Clivina napieria Baehr, 2015
- Clivina netolitzkyi Kult, 1951
- Clivina newcastleana Baehr, 2017
- Clivina nicholsona Baehr, 2015
- Clivina nigra Sloane, 1905
- Clivina nigrosuturata Baehr, 2015
- Clivina nitescens Baehr, 2017
- Clivina nitidula Putzeys, 1867
- Clivina normanbyensis Baehr, 2017
- Clivina normandi Kult, 1959
- Clivina normantona Baehr, 2015
- Clivina nourlangie Baehr, 2015
- Clivina nyctosyloides Putzeys, 1868
- Clivina obliquata Putzeys, 1867
- Clivina obliquicollis Sloane, 1905
- Clivina oblita Putzeys, 1867
- Clivina oblonga (Putzeys, 1873)
- Clivina obscuripennis Putzeys, 1867
- Clivina obscuripes Blackburn, 1890
- Clivina obsoleta Sloane, 1896
- Clivina occulta Sloane, 1896
- Clivina odontomera Putzeys, 1868
- Clivina okutanii Habu, 1958
- Clivina olliffi Sloane, 1896
- Clivina oodnadattae Blackburn, 1894
- Clivina orbitalis Baehr, 2008
- Clivina oregona Fall, 1922
- Clivina ovalior Baehr, 2017
- Clivina ovalipennis Sloane, 1905
- Clivina pachysoma Baehr, 2017
- Clivina pallida Say, 1823
- Clivina pallidiceps Sloane, 1905
- Clivina pampicola Putzeys, 1867
- Clivina pandana Andrewes, 1938
- Clivina paradebilis Baehr, 2008
- Clivina parallela Lesne, 1896
- Clivina parolliffi Baehr, 2015
- Clivina parryensis Baehr, 2015
- Clivina parryi Putzeys, 1861
- Clivina parvidens Putzeys, 1867
- Clivina parvula Putzeys, 1867
- Clivina paucidentata Baehr, 2015
- Clivina pectonada Sloane, 1905
- Clivina pectoralis Putzeys, 1868
- Clivina peninsulae Baehr, 2015
- Clivina pentecostensis Baehr, 2015
- Clivina perlonga Baehr, 2015
- Clivina pernigra Baehr, 2015
- Clivina perthensis Baehr, 1989
- Clivina pfisteri Andrewes, 1930
- Clivina picina Andrewes, 1936
- Clivina pilbarae Baehr, 2015
- Clivina pileolata Bates, 1892
- Clivina planiceps Putzeys, 1861
- Clivina planicollis LeConte, 1857
- Clivina planifrons Sloane, 1907
- Clivina planulata Putzeys, 1867
- Clivina platensis Putzeys, 1867
- Clivina platynota Baehr, 2017
- Clivina pluridentata Putzeys, 1877
- Clivina plurisetofaria Balkenohl, 2021
- Clivina pravei Lutshnik, 1927
- Clivina procera Putzeys, 1866
- Clivina profundestriolata Baehr, 2017
- Clivina pronotalis Baehr, 2015
- Clivina protibialis Baehr, 2008
- Clivina punctaticeps Putzeys, 1868
- Clivina puncticeps Darlington, 1962
- Clivina punctifrons Putzeys, 1867
- Clivina punctigera LeConte, 1857
- Clivina punctiventris Putzeys, 1867
- Clivina punctulata LeConte, 1852
- Clivina putzeysi Csiki, 1927
- Clivina quadrata Putzeys, 1867
- Clivina quadraticollis Baehr, 2015
- Clivina quadratifrons Sloane, 1896
- Clivina quadricornuta Baehr, 2015
- Clivina quadristriata Baehr, 2008
- Clivina queenslandica Sloane, 1896
- Clivina quinquesetosa Baehr, 2015
- Clivina rectipennis Baehr, 2017
- Clivina recurvidens Putzeys, 1867
- Clivina regularis Sloane, 1896
- Clivina reticulata Baehr, 2015
- Clivina riverinae Sloane, 1896
- Clivina robusta Sloane, 1905
- Clivina rokebyensis Baehr, 2015
- Clivina roperensis Baehr, 2015
- Clivina rubicunda LeConte, 1857
- Clivina rubripes Putzeys, 1868
- Clivina rubropicea Baehr, 2015
- Clivina rufipennis Baehr, 2008
- Clivina rufonigra Baehr, 1989
- Clivina rufula Darlington, 1962
- Clivina rugicollis Baehr, 2015
- Clivina rugosepunctata Baehr, 2015
- Clivina rugosifrons Baehr, 2017
- Clivina rugosofemoralis Balkenohl, 1999
- Clivina ryaceki Baehr, 2017
- Clivina sabulosa W.S.MacLeay, 1825
- Clivina sagittifera Baehr, 2015
- Clivina sansapor Darlington, 1962
- Clivina saundersi Andrewes, 1926
- Clivina scabra Baehr, 2015
- Clivina schaubergeri Kult, 1951
- Clivina schillhammeri Balkenohl, 2021
- Clivina sculpticeps Darlington, 1953
- Clivina sectifrons Bates, 1892
- Clivina sellata Putzeys, 1866
- Clivina semicava Baehr, 2015
- Clivina semirubra Baehr, 2017
- Clivina shortlandica Emden, 1937
- Clivina siamica Putzeys, 1867
- Clivina sicula Baudi di Selve, 1864
- Clivina simillima Baehr, 2015
- Clivina simulans Sloane, 1896
- Clivina sinuicola Baehr, 2017
- Clivina sloanei Csiki, 1927
- Clivina sodalis Baehr, 2015
- Clivina soror Baehr, 2008
- Clivina sororcula Baehr, 2015
- Clivina spadix Andrewes, 1929
- Clivina spatulata Baehr, 2015
- Clivina spatulifera Andrewes, 1929
- Clivina spinipes Putzeys, 1867
- Clivina stefaniana G.Müller, 1942
- Clivina sternalis Baehr, 2015
- Clivina storeyi Baehr, 2015
- Clivina stricta Putzeys, 1861
- Clivina stygica Putzeys, 1867
- Clivina subdepressa Kult, 1951
- Clivina subfoveiceps Kult, 1959
- Clivina subfusa Darlington, 1962
- Clivina subrufipes Baehr, 2017
- Clivina sulcaticeps Sloane, 1923
- Clivina sulcicollis Sloane, 1896
- Clivina suturalis Putzeys, 1861
- Clivina svenssoni Basilewsky, 1946
- Clivina synnotensis Baehr, 2015
- Clivina synoikos Baehr, 2015
- Clivina syriaca J.Sahlberg, 1908
- Clivina szekessyi Kult, 1951
- Clivina szitoi Baehr, 2008
- Clivina talpa Andrewes, 1927
- Clivina tanami Baehr, 2015
- Clivina taurina Putzeys, 1867
- Clivina tenuis Baehr, 2015
- Clivina territorialis Baehr, 2008
- Clivina thenmala Balkenohl, 2021
- Clivina thoracica Baehr, 2017
- Clivina toledanoi Baehr, 2015
- Clivina toombae Baehr, 2015
- Clivina torrida Putzeys, 1867
- Clivina toxopei Darlington, 1962
- Clivina tozeria Baehr, 2015
- Clivina trachys Andrewes, 1930
- Clivina transgrediens Baehr, 2015
- Clivina transversa Putzeys, 1867
- Clivina transversicollis Putzeys, 1867
- Clivina trapezicollis Baehr, 2015
- Clivina tribulationis Baehr, 2015
- Clivina tridentata Putzeys, 1867
- Clivina tripuncta Darlington, 1962
- Clivina triseriata Baehr, 2017
- Clivina tristis Putzeys, 1846
- Clivina truncata Putzeys, 1877
- Clivina tuberculata Putzeys, 1846
- Clivina tuberculifrons Blackburn, 1890
- Clivina ubirr Baehr, 2015
- Clivina ulrichi Baehr, 2015
- Clivina uluru Baehr, 2015
- Clivina uncinata Baehr, 2017
- Clivina uptoni Baehr, 2015
- Clivina vagans Putzeys, 1866
- Clivina validior Baehr, 2015
- Clivina variabilis Baehr, 2015
- Clivina variseta Baehr, 2017
- Clivina ventripunctata Baehr, 2015
- Clivina vicina Baehr, 2008
- Clivina victoriae Baehr, 2017
- Clivina vigil Darlington, 1962
- Clivina vittata Sloane, 1896
- Clivina vixsulcata Baehr, 2017
- Clivina vulgivaga Boheman, 1858
- Clivina wachteli Baehr, 2015
- Clivina wallacei Putzeys, 1867
- Clivina weanyanae Baehr, 2015
- Clivina weipae Baehr, 2015
- Clivina weiri Baehr, 2015
- Clivina werrisensis Baehr, 2015
- Clivina westralis Baehr, 2015
- Clivina westwoodi Putzeys, 1867
- Clivina wildi Blackburn, 1890
- Clivina wiluna Darlington, 1953
- Clivina windjanae Baehr, 2017
- Clivina wurargae Baehr, 2008
- Clivina yanoi Kult, 1951
- Clivina ypsilon Dejean, 1830
- Clivina zborowskii Baehr, 2015

Subgenus Cliviniella Kult, 1959

- Clivina albertiana Burgeon, 1935
- Clivina camerunensis Kult, 1959
- Clivina ghesquierei Kult, 1959
- Clivina veselyi Kult, 1959

Subgenus Dacca Putzeys, 1861

- Clivina boreri Balkenohl, 2020
- Clivina forcipata (Putzeys, 1861)
- Clivina ursulae Balkenohl, 2020

Subgenus Eoclivina Kult, 1959

- Clivina attenuata (Herbst, 1806)
- Clivina bhamoensis Bates, 1892
- Clivina burgeoni Kult, 1959
- Clivina dumolinii Putzeys, 1846
- Clivina machadoi Basilewsky, 1955
- Clivina sagittaria Bates, 1892
- Clivina striata Putzeys, 1846
- Clivina sulcigera Putzeys, 1867

Subgenus Leucocara Bousquet, 2009

- Clivina acuducta Haldeman, 1843
- Clivina allaeri Kult, 1959
- Clivina alluaudi Kult, 1947
- Clivina americana Dejean, 1831
- Clivina angolana Kult, 1959
- Clivina antoinei Kult, 1959
- Clivina aucta Erichson, 1843
- Clivina baenningeri Kult, 1951
- Clivina balfourbrownei Kult, 1951
- Clivina bartolozzii Magrini & Bulirsch, 2021
- Clivina basilewskyi Kult, 1959
- Clivina birmanica Kult, 1951
- Clivina caffra Putzeys, 1861
- Clivina californica Van Dyke, 1925
- Clivina capensis Kult, 1959
- Clivina cardiothorax Baehr, 2008
- Clivina championi Kult, 1951
- Clivina clypealis Baehr, 2008
- Clivina collarti Burgeon, 1935
- Clivina consobrina Putzeys, 1867
- Clivina coomani Kult, 1951
- Clivina damarina Péringuey, 1896
- Clivina decellei Basilewsky, 1968
- Clivina dewaillyi Kult, 1959
- Clivina donabaueri Dostal, 2012
- Clivina erythropyga Putzeys, 1867
- Clivina esulcata Baehr, 2008
- Clivina femoralis Putzeys, 1846
- Clivina fratercula Baehr, 2008
- Clivina girardi Kult, 1959
- Clivina heinemanni Kult, 1959
- Clivina hoberlandti Kult, 1951
- Clivina insignis Kult, 1959
- Clivina interstitialis Kolbe, 1883
- Clivina jeanneli Kult, 1959
- Clivina katangana Kult, 1959
- Clivina kawa Basilewsky, 1948
- Clivina kirschenhoferi Dostal, 2012
- Clivina kochi Schatzmayr, 1936
- Clivina lacustris Putzeys, 1867
- Clivina laevifrons Chaudoir, 1842
- Clivina latior Baehr, 2008
- Clivina lebisi Kult, 1959
- Clivina legorskyi Dostal, 2012
- Clivina madagascariensis Putzeys, 1846
- Clivina makolskii Kult, 1959
- Clivina martii Kult, 1959
- Clivina martinbaehri Dostal & Bulirsch, 2016
- Clivina maxima Kult, 1959
- Clivina montei Kult, 1959
- Clivina mordax Putzeys, 1861
- Clivina morio Dejean, 1831
- Clivina muelleri Kult, 1959
- Clivina ngayensis Burgeon, 1935
- Clivina niponensis Bates, 1873
- Clivina obenbergeri Kult, 1951
- Clivina opacidermis Baehr, 1989
- Clivina orientalis Kult, 1959
- Clivina pacholatkoi Dostal & Bulirsch, 2016
- Clivina palmeni Kult, 1959
- Clivina perplexa Péringuey, 1896
- Clivina pfefferi Kult, 1951
- Clivina rufa LeConte, 1857
- Clivina rugiceps Klug, 1832
- Clivina sacra Putzeys, 1875
- Clivina saigonica Kult, 1951
- Clivina sakalava Dostal, 2016
- Clivina schatzmayri Kult, 1959
- Clivina schuhi Dostal, 2016
- Clivina semicarinata Putzeys, 1877
- Clivina simplicifrons Fairmaire, 1901
- Clivina sobrina Dejean, 1831
- Clivina straneoi Kult, 1959
- Clivina subterranea Decou; Nitzu & Juberthie, 1994
- Clivina sudanensis Kult, 1959
- Clivina tanganyikana Kult, 1959
- Clivina tranquebarica Bonelli, 1813
- Clivina tutancamon Schatzmayr, 1936
- Clivina vosahloi Kult, 1959
- Clivina yorkiana Baehr, 2008
- Clivina zebi Kult, 1951

Subgenus Paraclivina Kult, 1947

- Clivina bipustulata (Fabricius, 1798)
- Clivina convexa LeConte, 1844
- Clivina fasciata Putzeys, 1846
- Clivina fassatii Kult, 1947
- Clivina ferrea LeConte, 1857
- Clivina floridae Csiki, 1927
- Clivina marginipennis Putzeys, 1846
- Clivina postica LeConte, 1846
- Clivina stigmula Putzeys, 1846
- Clivina striatopunctata Dejean, 1831
- Clivina sulcipennis Putzeys, 1867

Subgenus Physoclivina Kult, 1959

- Clivina bulirschi Dostal, 2015
- Clivina donabaueriana Dostal, 2015
- Clivina dostaliana Balkenohl, 2018
- Clivina physopleura Burgeon, 1935
