= Clivina stefaniana =

Scientific classification
- Domain: Eukaryota
- Kingdom: Animalia
- Phylum: Arthropoda
- Class: Insecta
- Order: Coleoptera
- Suborder: Adephaga
- Family: Carabidae
- Genus: Clivina
- Species: C. stefaniana

Binomial name
- Clivina stefaniana Gi. Muller, 1942

Species of beetle

Clivina stefaniana is a species of ground beetle in the subfamily Scaritinae. It was described by Josef Müller under the name "Giuseppe Müller" in 1942.
