= Clivina aucta =

Scientific classification
- Kingdom: Animalia
- Phylum: Arthropoda
- Class: Insecta
- Order: Coleoptera
- Suborder: Adephaga
- Family: Carabidae
- Genus: Clivina
- Species: C. aucta

Binomial name
- Clivina aucta Erichson, 1843

Species of beetle

Clivina aucta is a species of ground beetle in the subfamily Scaritinae. It was described by Wilhelm Ferdinand Erichson in 1843. It has two subspecies: Clivina aucta aucta and Clivina aucta aethiopica.
