= Clivina oodnadattae =

Scientific classification
- Domain: Eukaryota
- Kingdom: Animalia
- Phylum: Arthropoda
- Class: Insecta
- Order: Coleoptera
- Suborder: Adephaga
- Family: Carabidae
- Genus: Clivina
- Species: C. oodnadattae

Binomial name
- Clivina oodnadattae Blackburn, 1894

Species of beetle

Clivina oodnadattae is a species of ground beetle in the subfamily Scaritinae. It was described by Blackburn in 1894.
