= Clivina janae =

Scientific classification
- Domain: Eukaryota
- Kingdom: Animalia
- Phylum: Arthropoda
- Class: Insecta
- Order: Coleoptera
- Suborder: Adephaga
- Family: Carabidae
- Genus: Clivina
- Species: C. janae

Binomial name
- Clivina janae Kult, 1959

Species of beetle

Clivina janae is a species of ground beetle in the subfamily Scaritinae. It was described by Kult in 1959.
