= Clivina punctulata =

Scientific classification
- Domain: Eukaryota
- Kingdom: Animalia
- Phylum: Arthropoda
- Class: Insecta
- Order: Coleoptera
- Suborder: Adephaga
- Family: Carabidae
- Genus: Clivina
- Species: C. punctulata

Binomial name
- Clivina punctulata LeConte, 1852

Species of beetle

Clivina punctulata is a species of ground beetle in the subfamily Scaritinae. It was described by John Lawrence LeConte in 1852.
