= Clivina californica =

Scientific classification
- Domain: Eukaryota
- Kingdom: Animalia
- Phylum: Arthropoda
- Class: Insecta
- Order: Coleoptera
- Suborder: Adephaga
- Family: Carabidae
- Genus: Clivina
- Species: C. californica

Binomial name
- Clivina californica Van Dyke, 1925

Species of beetle

Clivina californica is a species of ground beetle in the subfamily Scaritinae. It was described by Van Dyke in 1925.
