= Clivina laevifrons =

Scientific classification
- Domain: Eukaryota
- Kingdom: Animalia
- Phylum: Arthropoda
- Class: Insecta
- Order: Coleoptera
- Suborder: Adephaga
- Family: Carabidae
- Genus: Clivina
- Species: C. laevifrons

Binomial name
- Clivina laevifrons Chaudoir, 1842

Species of beetle

Clivina laevifrons is a species of ground beetle in the subfamily Scaritinae. It was described by Maximilien Chaudoir in 1842.
