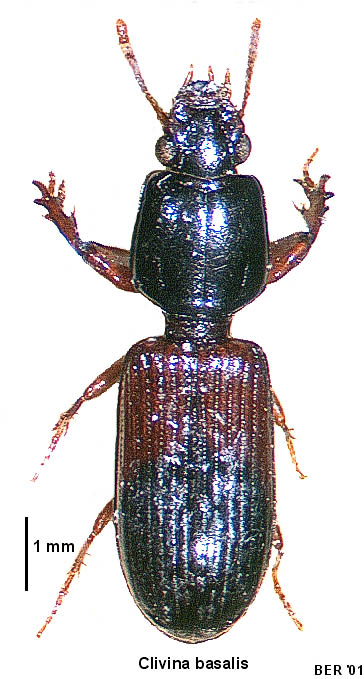

Scientific classification
- Domain: Eukaryota
- Kingdom: Animalia
- Phylum: Arthropoda
- Class: Insecta
- Order: Coleoptera
- Suborder: Adephaga
- Family: Carabidae
- Genus: Clivina
- Species: C. basalis

Binomial name
- Clivina basalis Chaudoir, 1843

= Clivina basalis =

Species of beetle

Clivina basalis is a species of ground beetle in the subfamily Scaritinae. It was described by Chaudoir in 1843.
