= Clivina machadoi =

Scientific classification
- Domain: Eukaryota
- Kingdom: Animalia
- Phylum: Arthropoda
- Class: Insecta
- Order: Coleoptera
- Suborder: Adephaga
- Family: Carabidae
- Genus: Clivina
- Species: C. machadoi

Binomial name
- Clivina machadoi Basilewsky, 1955

Species of beetle

Clivina machadoi is a species of ground beetle in the subfamily Scaritinae. It was described by Pierre Basilewsky in 1955.
