= Clivina rugosofemoralis =

Scientific classification
- Kingdom: Animalia
- Phylum: Arthropoda
- Class: Insecta
- Order: Coleoptera
- Suborder: Adephaga
- Family: Carabidae
- Genus: Clivina
- Species: C. rugosofemoralis

Binomial name
- Clivina rugosofemoralis Balkenohl, 1999

Species of beetle

Clivina rugosofemoralis is a species of ground beetle in the subfamily Scaritinae. It was described by Balkenohl in 1999.
