= Clivina alabama =

Scientific classification
- Domain: Eukaryota
- Kingdom: Animalia
- Phylum: Arthropoda
- Class: Insecta
- Order: Coleoptera
- Suborder: Adephaga
- Family: Carabidae
- Genus: Clivina
- Species: C. alabama

Binomial name
- Clivina alabama Bousquet, 2012

Species of beetle

Clivina alabama is a species of ground beetle found in the southeastern United States. It is in the subfamily Scaritinae. It was described by Bousquet in 2012.
