= Clivina decellei =

Scientific classification
- Domain: Eukaryota
- Kingdom: Animalia
- Phylum: Arthropoda
- Class: Insecta
- Order: Coleoptera
- Suborder: Adephaga
- Family: Carabidae
- Genus: Clivina
- Species: C. decellei

Binomial name
- Clivina decellei Basilewsky, 1968

Species of beetle

Clivina decellei is a species of ground beetle in the subfamily Scaritinae. It was described by Basilewsky in 1968.
