= Clivina pallida =

Scientific classification
- Domain: Eukaryota
- Kingdom: Animalia
- Phylum: Arthropoda
- Class: Insecta
- Order: Coleoptera
- Suborder: Adephaga
- Family: Carabidae
- Genus: Clivina
- Species: C. pallida

Binomial name
- Clivina pallida Say, 1823

Species of beetle

Clivina pallida is a species of ground beetle in the subfamily Scaritinae. It was described by Thomas Say in 1823.
