= Clivina putzeysi =

Scientific classification
- Domain: Eukaryota
- Kingdom: Animalia
- Phylum: Arthropoda
- Class: Insecta
- Order: Coleoptera
- Suborder: Adephaga
- Family: Carabidae
- Genus: Clivina
- Species: C. putzeysi

Binomial name
- Clivina putzeysi Csíki, 1927

Species of beetle

Clivina putzeysi is a species of ground beetle in the subfamily Scaritinae. It was described by Csiki in 1927.
