= Clivina difformis =

Scientific classification
- Domain: Eukaryota
- Kingdom: Animalia
- Phylum: Arthropoda
- Class: Insecta
- Order: Coleoptera
- Suborder: Adephaga
- Family: Carabidae
- Genus: Clivina
- Species: C. difformis

Binomial name
- Clivina difformis Putzeys, 1868

Species of beetle

Clivina difformis is a species of ground beetle in the subfamily Scaritinae. It was described by Jules Putzeys in 1868.
