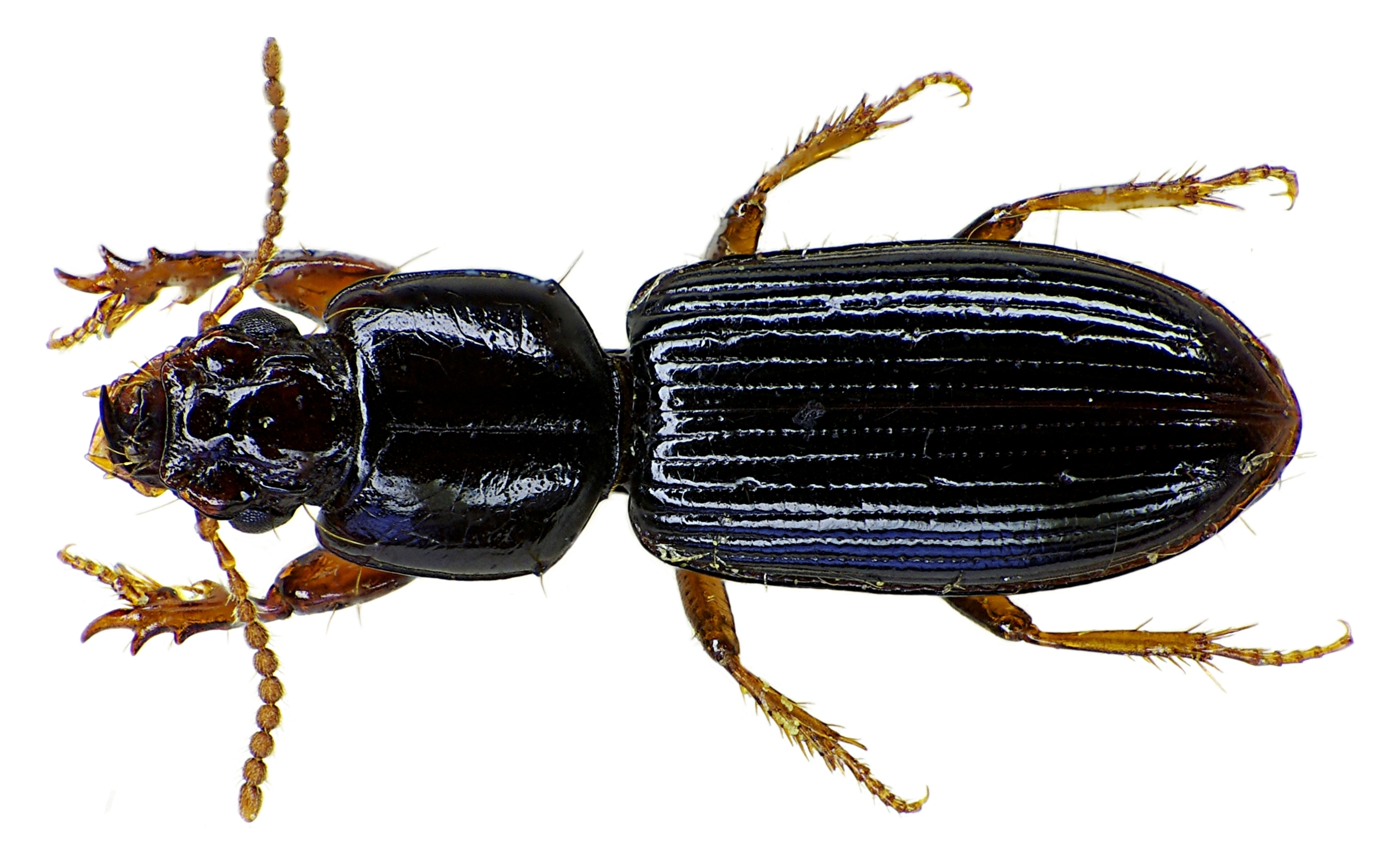

Scientific classification
- Kingdom: Animalia
- Phylum: Arthropoda
- Class: Insecta
- Order: Coleoptera
- Suborder: Adephaga
- Family: Carabidae
- Genus: Clivina
- Species: C. exilis

Binomial name
- Clivina exilis Sloane, 1916

= Clivina exilis =

Species of beetle

Clivina exilis is a species of ground beetle in the subfamily Scaritinae. It was described by Sloane in 1916. It lives in Australia, though not much info about this species is generally available for easy access online.
