= Clivina picina =

Scientific classification
- Domain: Eukaryota
- Kingdom: Animalia
- Phylum: Arthropoda
- Class: Insecta
- Order: Coleoptera
- Suborder: Adephaga
- Family: Carabidae
- Genus: Clivina
- Species: C. picina

Binomial name
- Clivina picina Andrewes, 1936

Species of beetle

Clivina picina is a species of ground beetle in the subfamily Scaritinae. It was described by Andrewes in 1936.
