= Clivina saigonica =

Scientific classification
- Kingdom: Animalia
- Phylum: Arthropoda
- Class: Insecta
- Order: Coleoptera
- Suborder: Adephaga
- Family: Carabidae
- Genus: Clivina
- Species: C. saigonica

Binomial name
- Clivina saigonica Kult, 1951

Species of beetle

Clivina saigonica is a species of ground beetle in the subfamily Scaritinae. It was described by Kult in 1951. It is found in China, Vietnam, and the Indonesian island of Borneo.
