= Clivina karikali =

Scientific classification
- Domain: Eukaryota
- Kingdom: Animalia
- Phylum: Arthropoda
- Class: Insecta
- Order: Coleoptera
- Suborder: Adephaga
- Family: Carabidae
- Genus: Clivina
- Species: C. karikali

Binomial name
- Clivina karikali A. Jedlička, 1964

Species of beetle

Clivina karikali is a species of ground beetle in the subfamily Scaritinae. It was described by Jedlicka in 1964.
