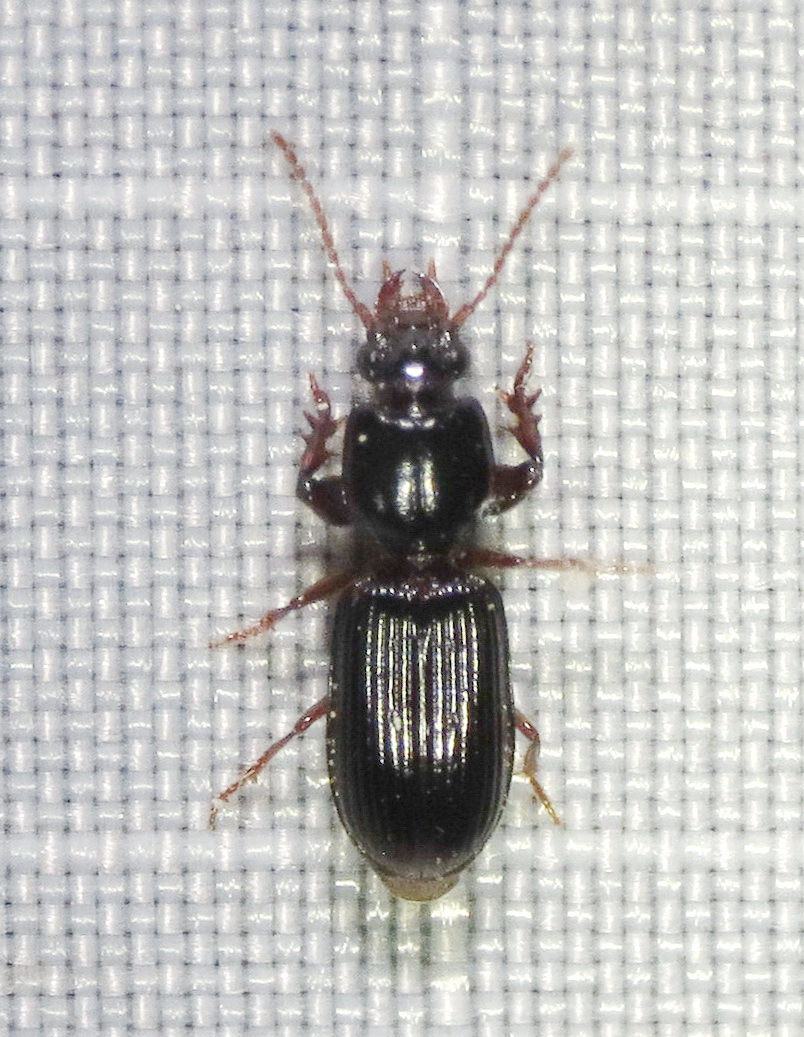
- Clivina americana, Virginia

Scientific classification
- Kingdom: Animalia
- Phylum: Arthropoda
- Class: Insecta
- Order: Coleoptera
- Suborder: Adephaga
- Family: Carabidae
- Genus: Clivina
- Species: C. americana

Binomial name
- Clivina americana Dejean, 1831

Synonyms
- Clivina analis Putzeys, 1846

= Clivina americana =

Species of beetle

Clivina americana is a species of ground beetle in the subfamily Scaritinae, found in North America. It was described by Pierre François Marie Auguste Dejean in 1831.
