= Clivina emarginata =

Scientific classification
- Domain: Eukaryota
- Kingdom: Animalia
- Phylum: Arthropoda
- Class: Insecta
- Order: Coleoptera
- Suborder: Adephaga
- Family: Carabidae
- Genus: Clivina
- Species: C. emarginata

Binomial name
- Clivina emarginata Putzeys, 1868

Synonyms
- Clivina tumidipes Sloane, 1896

Species of beetle

Clivina emarginata is a species of ground beetle in the subfamily Scaritinae, native to Australia. It was described by Jules Putzeys in 1868.
