= Clivina sabulosa =

Scientific classification
- Kingdom: Animalia
- Phylum: Arthropoda
- Class: Insecta
- Order: Coleoptera
- Suborder: Adephaga
- Family: Carabidae
- Genus: Clivina
- Species: C. sabulosa

Binomial name
- Clivina sabulosa W. S. Macleay, 1825

Species of beetle

Clivina sabulosa is a species of ground beetle in the subfamily Scaritinae. It was described by W.S.Macleay in 1825.
