= Clivina subterranea =

Scientific classification
- Domain: Eukaryota
- Kingdom: Animalia
- Phylum: Arthropoda
- Class: Insecta
- Order: Coleoptera
- Suborder: Adephaga
- Family: Carabidae
- Genus: Clivina
- Species: C. subterranea

Binomial name
- Clivina subterranea Decu, Nitzu & Juberthie, 1994

Species of beetle

Clivina subterranea is a species of ground beetle in the subfamily Scaritinae. It was described by Decu, Nitzu & Juberthie in 1994.
