= Clivina bhamoensis =

Scientific classification
- Domain: Eukaryota
- Kingdom: Animalia
- Phylum: Arthropoda
- Class: Insecta
- Order: Coleoptera
- Suborder: Adephaga
- Family: Carabidae
- Genus: Clivina
- Species: C. bhamoensis

Binomial name
- Clivina bhamoensis H. W. Bates, 1892

Species of beetle

Clivina bhamoensis is a species of ground beetle in the subfamily Scaritinae. It was described by Henry Walter Bates in 1892.
