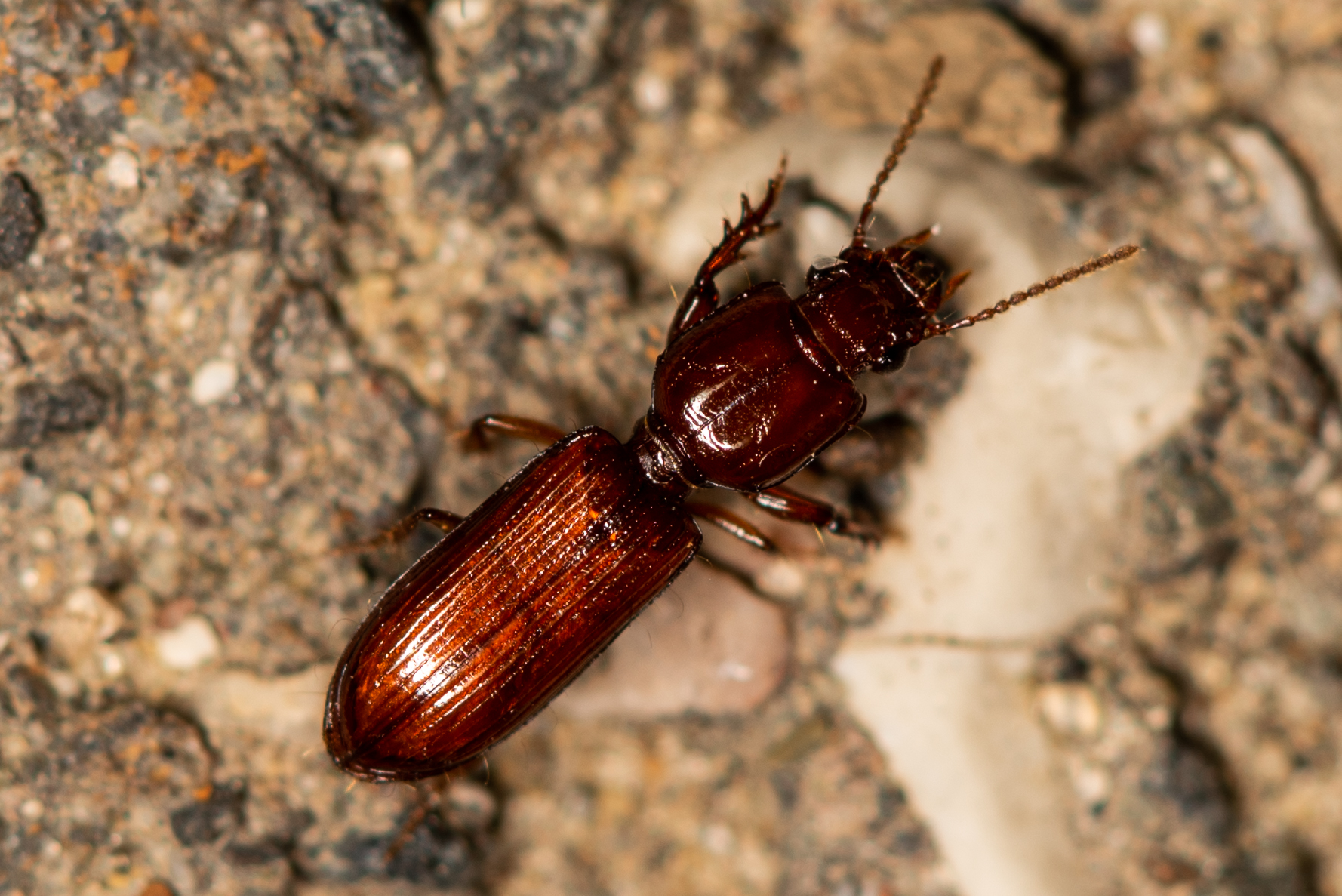

Scientific classification
- Kingdom: Animalia
- Phylum: Arthropoda
- Class: Insecta
- Order: Coleoptera
- Suborder: Adephaga
- Family: Carabidae
- Genus: Clivina
- Species: C. ypsilon

Binomial name
- Clivina ypsilon Dejean, 1830

= Clivina ypsilon =

Species of beetle

Clivina ypsilon is a species of ground beetle in the subfamily Scaritinae. It was described by Pierre François Marie Auguste Dejean in 1830.

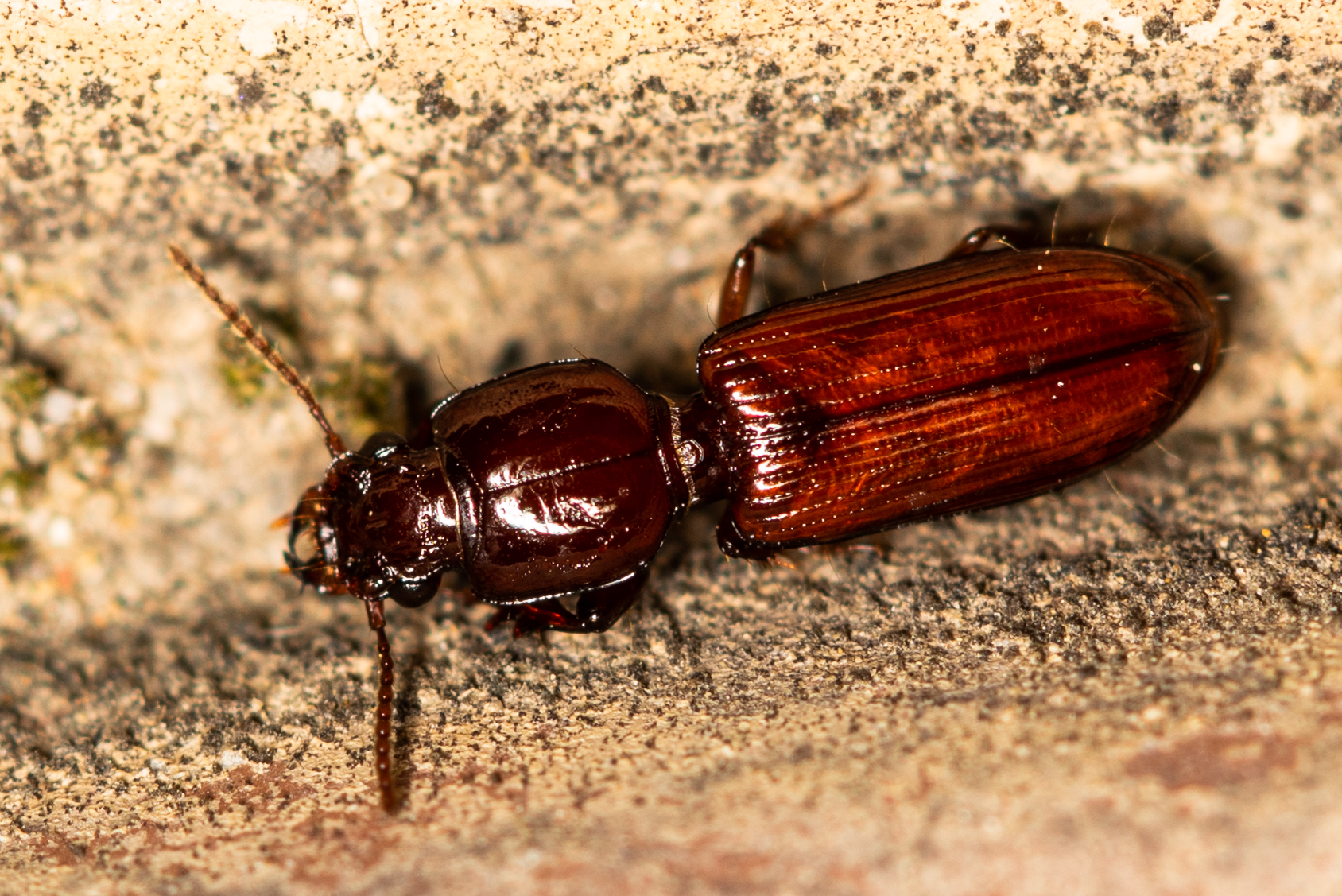
