= Clivina dealata =

Scientific classification
- Domain: Eukaryota
- Kingdom: Animalia
- Phylum: Arthropoda
- Class: Insecta
- Order: Coleoptera
- Suborder: Adephaga
- Family: Carabidae
- Genus: Clivina
- Species: C. dealata

Binomial name
- Clivina dealata Darlington, 1962

Species of beetle

Clivina dealata is a species of ground beetle in the subfamily Scaritinae, described by Darlington in 1962.
