= Clivina pravei =

Scientific classification
- Domain: Eukaryota
- Kingdom: Animalia
- Phylum: Arthropoda
- Class: Insecta
- Order: Coleoptera
- Suborder: Adephaga
- Family: Carabidae
- Genus: Clivina
- Species: C. pravei

Binomial name
- Clivina pravei Lutshnik, 1927

Species of beetle

Clivina pravei is a species of ground beetle in the subfamily Scaritinae. It was described by Lutshnik in 1927.
