= Clivina ampandrandavae =

Scientific classification
- Domain: Eukaryota
- Kingdom: Animalia
- Phylum: Arthropoda
- Class: Insecta
- Order: Coleoptera
- Suborder: Adephaga
- Family: Carabidae
- Genus: Clivina
- Species: C. ampandrandavae

Binomial name
- Clivina ampandrandavae Basilewsky, 1973

Species of beetle

Clivina ampandrandavae is a species of ground beetle in the subfamily Scaritinae. It was described by Basilewsky in 1973.
