= Clivina dolens =

Scientific classification
- Domain: Eukaryota
- Kingdom: Animalia
- Phylum: Arthropoda
- Class: Insecta
- Order: Coleoptera
- Suborder: Adephaga
- Family: Carabidae
- Genus: Clivina
- Species: C. dolens

Binomial name
- Clivina dolens Putzeys, 1873

Species of beetle

Clivina dolens is a species of ground beetle in the subfamily Scaritinae. It was described by Jules Putzeys in 1873.
