= Clivina choatei =

Scientific classification
- Domain: Eukaryota
- Kingdom: Animalia
- Phylum: Arthropoda
- Class: Insecta
- Order: Coleoptera
- Suborder: Adephaga
- Family: Carabidae
- Genus: Clivina
- Species: C. choatei

Binomial name
- Clivina choatei Bousquet & Skelley, 2012

Species of beetle

Clivina choatei is a species of ground beetle in the subfamily Scaritinae. It was described by Bousquet & Skelley in 2012.
