= Clivina attenuata =

Scientific classification
- Kingdom: Animalia
- Phylum: Arthropoda
- Class: Insecta
- Order: Coleoptera
- Suborder: Adephaga
- Family: Carabidae
- Genus: Clivina
- Species: C. attenuata

Binomial name
- Clivina attenuata (Herbst, 1806)

Species of beetle

Clivina attenuata is a species of ground beetle in the subfamily Scaritinae. It was described by Herbst in 1806.
