= Clivina sicula =

Scientific classification
- Domain: Eukaryota
- Kingdom: Animalia
- Phylum: Arthropoda
- Class: Insecta
- Order: Coleoptera
- Suborder: Adephaga
- Family: Carabidae
- Genus: Clivina
- Species: C. sicula

Binomial name
- Clivina sicula Baudi, 1864

Species of beetle

Clivina sicula is a species of ground beetle in the subfamily Scaritinae. It was described by Baudi in 1864.
