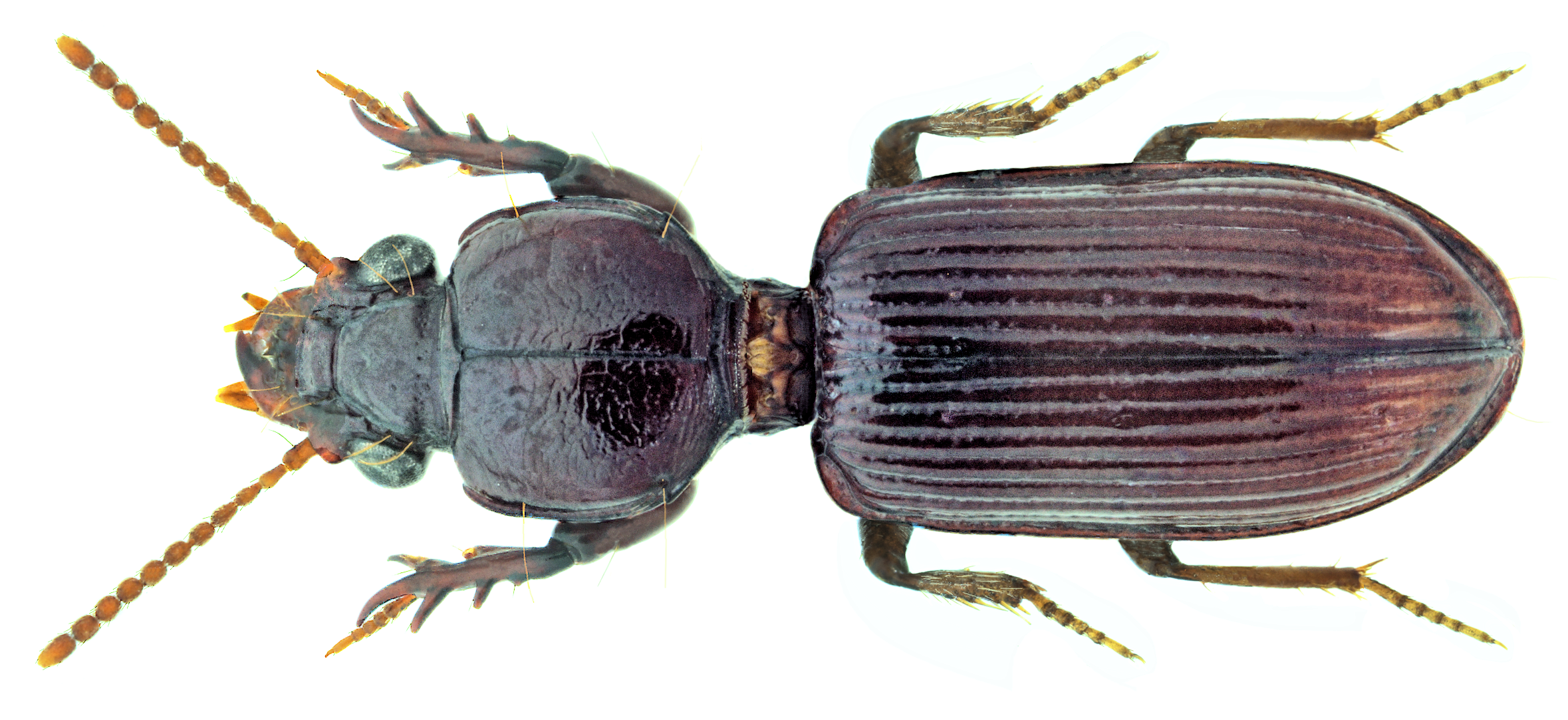
- Family: Carabidae Size: 5,5 mm Location: Kenya, Tsavo National Park, Voi Lodge, 550 m leg. U.Schmidt, 25.XI.1991; det. P.Bulirsch, 2011

Scientific classification
- Domain: Eukaryota
- Kingdom: Animalia
- Phylum: Arthropoda
- Class: Insecta
- Order: Coleoptera
- Suborder: Adephaga
- Family: Carabidae
- Genus: Clivina
- Species: C. montei

Binomial name
- Clivina montei Kult, 1959

= Clivina montei =

Species of beetle

Clivina montei is a species of ground beetle in the subfamily Scaritinae. It was described by Kult in 1959.
