= Clivina oregona =

Scientific classification
- Domain: Eukaryota
- Kingdom: Animalia
- Phylum: Arthropoda
- Class: Insecta
- Order: Coleoptera
- Suborder: Adephaga
- Family: Carabidae
- Genus: Clivina
- Species: C. oregona

Binomial name
- Clivina oregona Fall, 1922

Species of beetle

Clivina oregona is a species of ground beetle in the subfamily Scaritinae. It was described by Fall in 1922.
