= Clivina simplicifrons =

Scientific classification
- Kingdom: Animalia
- Phylum: Arthropoda
- Class: Insecta
- Order: Coleoptera
- Suborder: Adephaga
- Family: Carabidae
- Genus: Clivina
- Species: C. simplicifrons

Binomial name
- Clivina simplicifrons Fairmaire, 1901

Species of beetle

Clivina simplicifrons is a species of ground beetle in the subfamily Scaritinae. It was described by Fairmaire in 1901.
