= Clivina syriaca =

Scientific classification
- Domain: Eukaryota
- Kingdom: Animalia
- Phylum: Arthropoda
- Class: Insecta
- Order: Coleoptera
- Suborder: Adephaga
- Family: Carabidae
- Genus: Clivina
- Species: C. syriaca

Binomial name
- Clivina syriaca J. R. Sahlberg, 1908

Species of beetle

Clivina syriaca is a species of ground beetle in the subfamily Scaritinae. It was described by J.Sahlberg in 1908.
