= Clivina bipustulata =

Scientific classification
- Domain: Eukaryota
- Kingdom: Animalia
- Phylum: Arthropoda
- Class: Insecta
- Order: Coleoptera
- Suborder: Adephaga
- Family: Carabidae
- Genus: Clivina
- Species: C. bipustulata

Binomial name
- Clivina bipustulata (Fabricius, 1801)

Species of beetle

Clivina bipustulata is a species of ground beetle in the subfamily Scaritinae. It was described by Johan Christian Fabricius in 1801.
