= Clivina shortlandica =

Scientific classification
- Domain: Eukaryota
- Kingdom: Animalia
- Phylum: Arthropoda
- Class: Insecta
- Order: Coleoptera
- Suborder: Adephaga
- Family: Carabidae
- Genus: Clivina
- Species: C. shortlandica

Binomial name
- Clivina shortlandica van Emden, 1937

Species of beetle

Clivina shortlandica is a species of ground beetle in the subfamily Scaritinae. It was described by Emden in 1937.
