= Clivina sasajii =

Scientific classification
- Domain: Eukaryota
- Kingdom: Animalia
- Phylum: Arthropoda
- Class: Insecta
- Order: Coleoptera
- Suborder: Adephaga
- Family: Carabidae
- Genus: Clivina
- Species: C. sasajii

Binomial name
- Clivina sasajii G. E. Ball, 2001

Species of beetle

Clivina sasajii is a species of ground beetle in the subfamily Scaritinae. It was described by Ball in 2001.
