= Clivina convexa =

Scientific classification
- Domain: Eukaryota
- Kingdom: Animalia
- Phylum: Arthropoda
- Class: Insecta
- Order: Coleoptera
- Suborder: Adephaga
- Family: Carabidae
- Genus: Clivina
- Species: C. convexa

Binomial name
- Clivina convexa LeConte, 1844

Species of beetle

Clivina convexa is a species of ground beetle in the subfamily Scaritinae. It was described by John Lawrence LeConte in 1844.
