= Clivina interstitialis =

Scientific classification
- Domain: Eukaryota
- Kingdom: Animalia
- Phylum: Arthropoda
- Class: Insecta
- Order: Coleoptera
- Suborder: Adephaga
- Family: Carabidae
- Genus: Clivina
- Species: C. interstitialis

Binomial name
- Clivina interstitialis W. Kolbe, 1883

Species of beetle

Clivina interstitialis is a species of ground beetle in the subfamily Scaritinae. It was described by W.Kolbe in 1883.
