= Clivina okutanii =

Scientific classification
- Kingdom: Animalia
- Phylum: Arthropoda
- Class: Insecta
- Order: Coleoptera
- Suborder: Adephaga
- Family: Carabidae
- Genus: Clivina
- Species: C. okutanii

Binomial name
- Clivina okutanii Habu, 1958

Species of beetle

Clivina okutanii is a species of ground beetle in the subfamily Scaritinae. It was described by Habu in 1958.
