= Clivina arunachalensis =

Scientific classification
- Kingdom: Animalia
- Phylum: Arthropoda
- Class: Insecta
- Order: Coleoptera
- Suborder: Adephaga
- Family: Carabidae
- Genus: Clivina
- Species: C. arunachalensis

Binomial name
- Clivina arunachalensis Saha & Biswas, 1985

Species of beetle

Clivina arunachalensis is a species of ground beetle in the subfamily Scaritinae. It was described by Saha & Biswas in 1985. It is known from India. Its type locality is Namdhapa in Tirap district, Arunachal Pradesh.

Adult Clivina arunachalensis measure 7.5 mm (0.30 in) in length and are black in color.
