= Clivina bolivari =

Scientific classification
- Domain: Eukaryota
- Kingdom: Animalia
- Phylum: Arthropoda
- Class: Insecta
- Order: Coleoptera
- Suborder: Adephaga
- Family: Carabidae
- Genus: Clivina
- Species: C. bolivari

Binomial name
- Clivina bolivari (T. C. Barr, 1967)

Species of beetle

Clivina bolivari is a species of ground beetle in the subfamily Scaritinae. It was described by Barr in 1967.
