= Clivina rugiceps =

Scientific classification
- Domain: Eukaryota
- Kingdom: Animalia
- Phylum: Arthropoda
- Class: Insecta
- Order: Coleoptera
- Suborder: Adephaga
- Family: Carabidae
- Genus: Clivina
- Species: C. rugiceps

Binomial name
- Clivina rugiceps Klug, 1832

Species of beetle

Clivina rugiceps is a species of ground beetle in the subfamily Scaritinae. It was described by Johann Christoph Friedrich Klug in 1832. characterized by a body length ranging from 6.2 to 7.5 millimeters.
