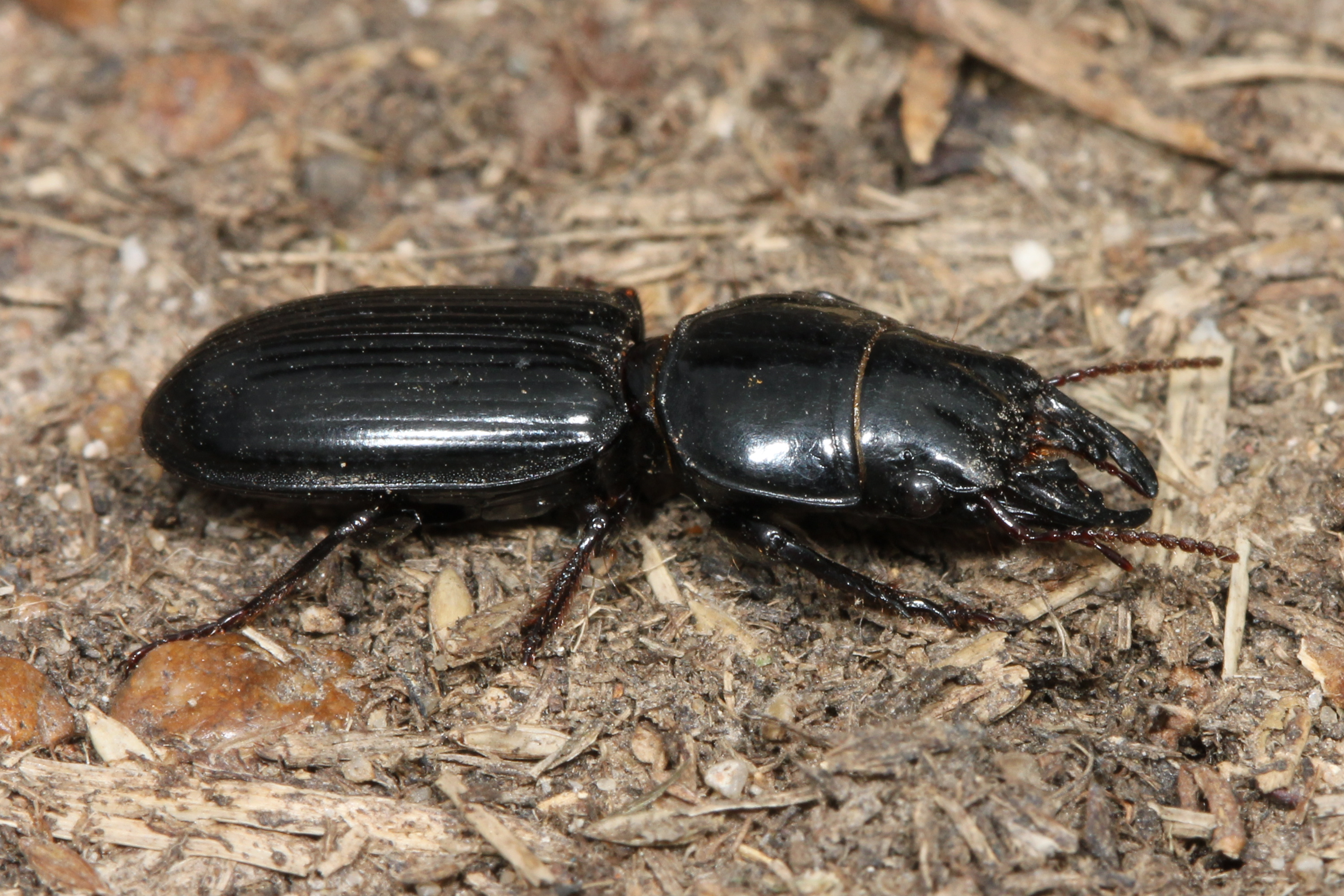
- Scarites subterraneus

Scientific classification
- Kingdom: Animalia
- Phylum: Arthropoda
- Class: Insecta
- Order: Coleoptera
- Suborder: Adephaga
- Family: Carabidae
- Subfamily: Scaritinae; Bonelli, 1810

= Scaritinae =

Subfamily of beetles

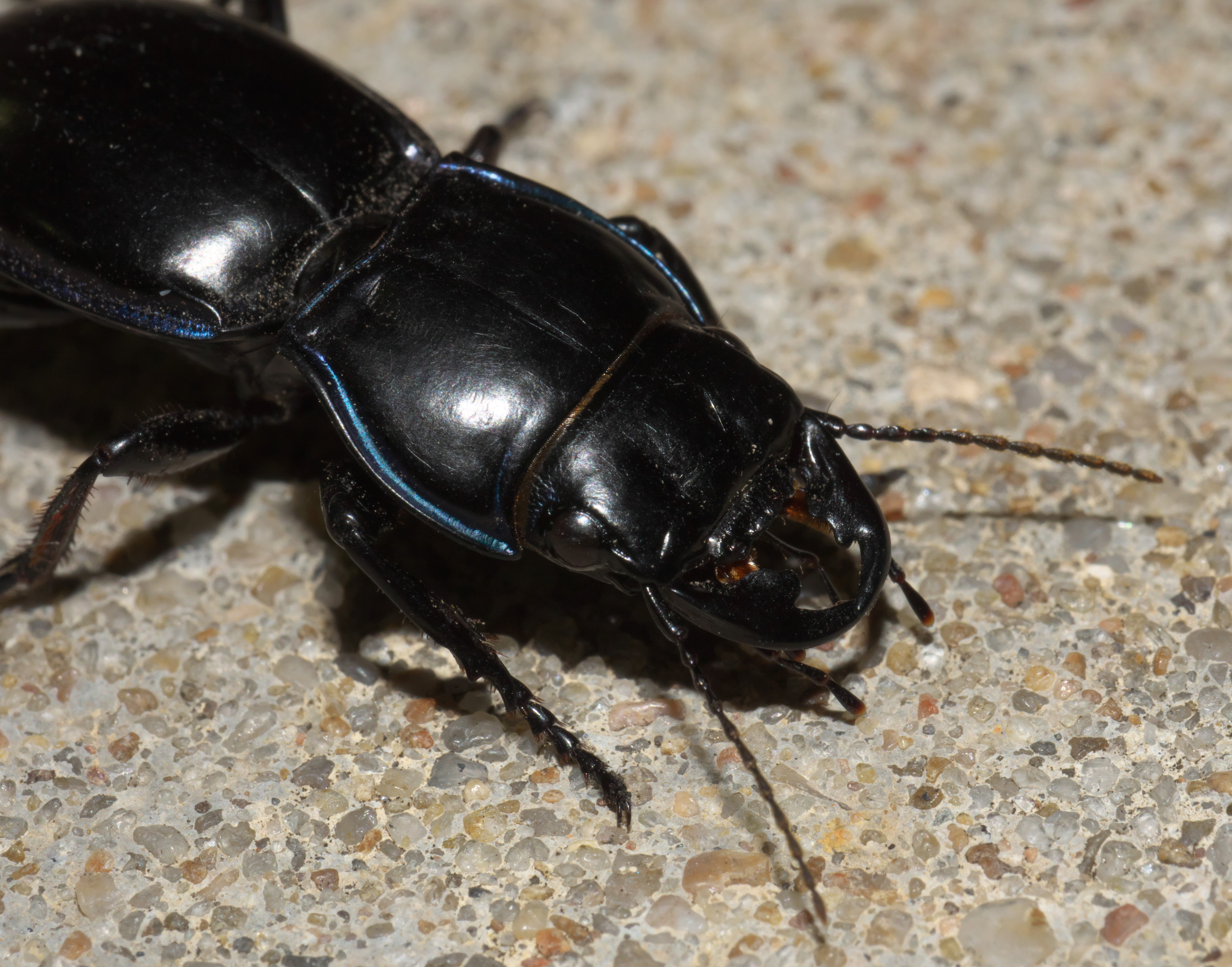
Pasimachus

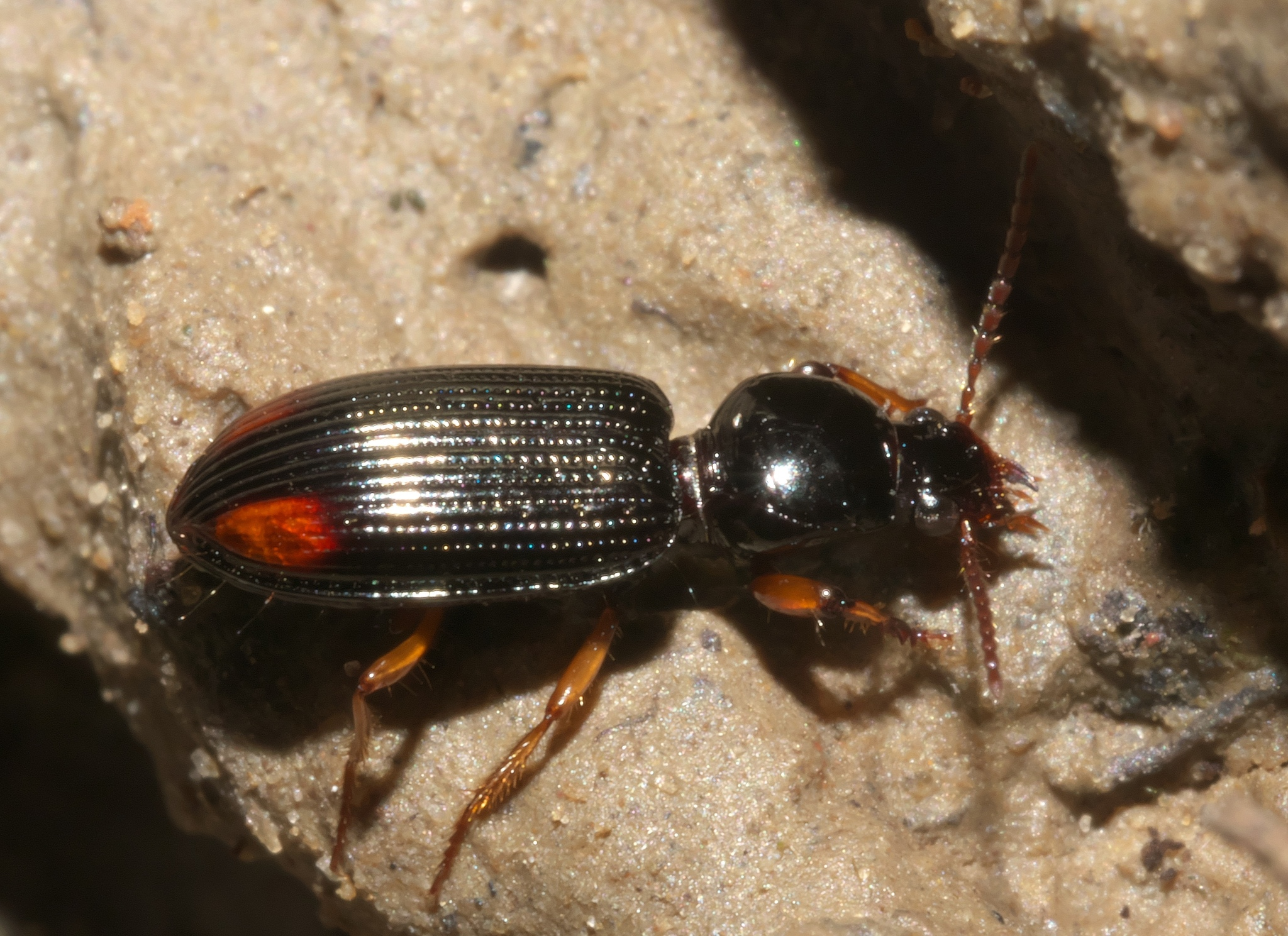
Aspidoglossa subangulata, Oklahoma

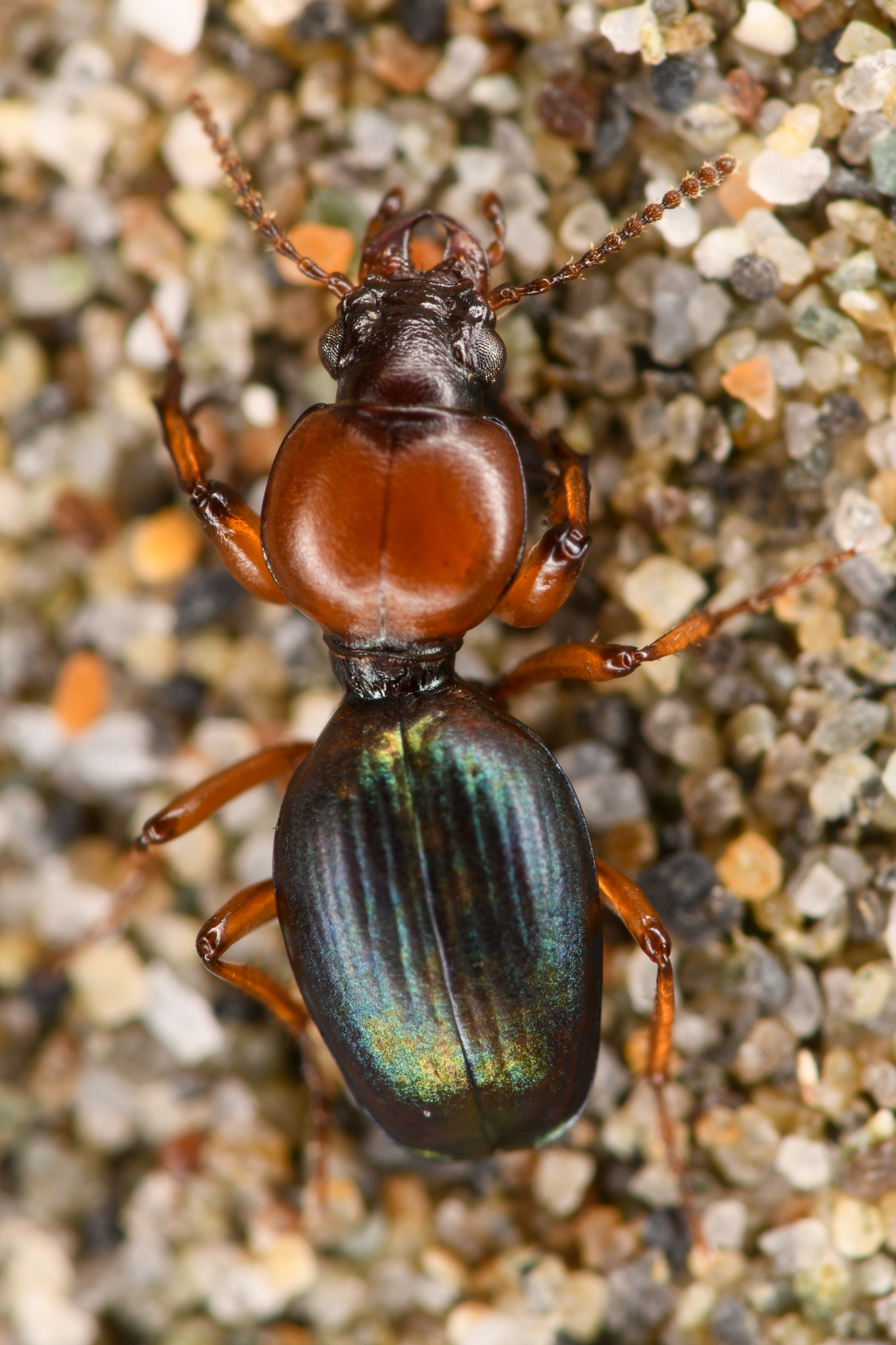
Akephorus obesus, California

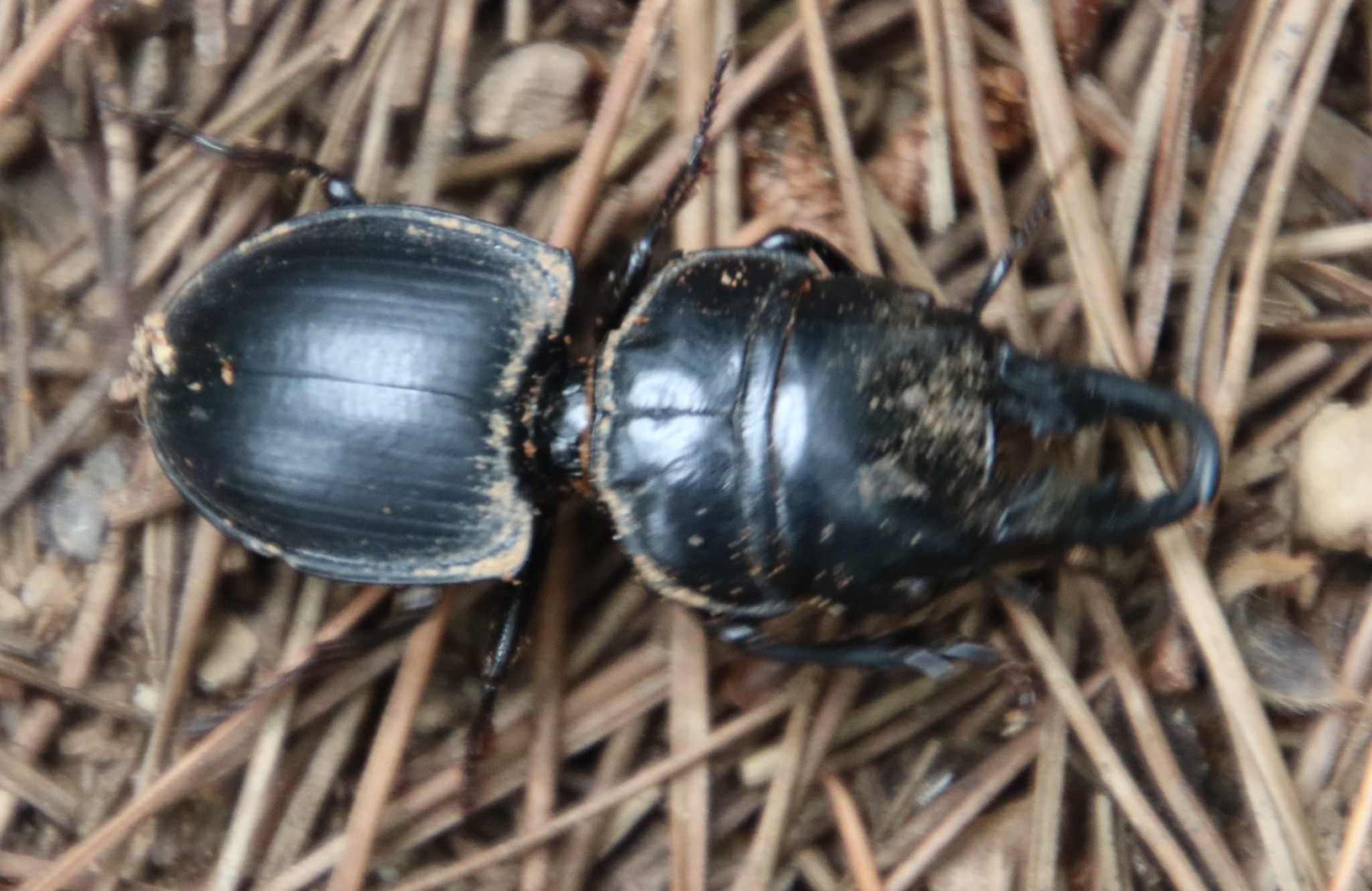
Pachyodontus languidus, South Africa

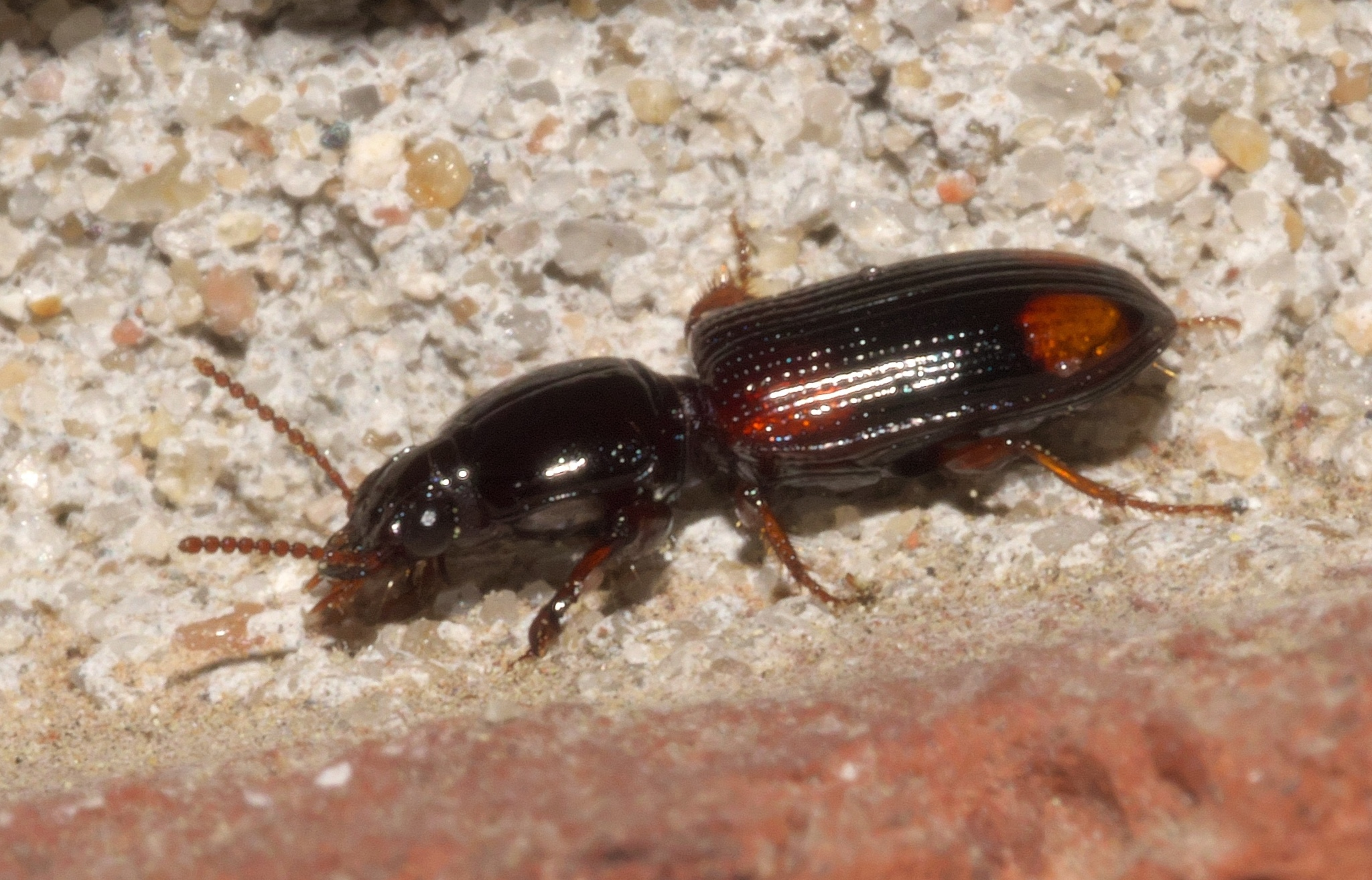
Paraclivina bipustulata, Oklahoma

Scaritinae is a worldwide subfamily of beetles in the family Carabidae, containing more than 2400 species in over 140 genera.

== Scaritinae genera ==
These 146 genera belong to Scaritinae.

Tribe Clivinini Rafinesque, 1815

- Subtribe Androzelmina R.T.Bell, 1998
  - Androzelma Dostal, 1993
- Subtribe Ardistomina Putzeys, 1867
  - Ardistomis Putzeys, 1846
  - Aspidoglossa Putzeys, 1846
  - Kearophus Dajoz, 2004
  - Semiardistomis Kult, 1950
- Subtribe Clivinina Rafinesque, 1815
  - Afrosyleter Basilewsky, 1959
  - Ancus Putzeys, 1867
  - Basilewskyana Kult, 1959
  - Brachypelus Putzeys, 1867
  - Cameroniola Baehr, 2000
  - Climax Putzeys, 1861
  - Clivina Latreille, 1802
  - Clivinarchus Sloane, 1896
  - Cryptomma Putzeys, 1846
  - Lachenus Putzeys, 1846
  - Leleuporella Basilewsky, 1956
  - Nannoryctes Baehr, 2000
  - Nyctosyles Putzeys, 1867
  - Orictites Andrewes, 1931
  - Platysphyrus Sloane, 1905
  - Psilidius Jeannel, 1957
  - Pyramoides Bousquet, 2002
  - Rhysocara Sloane, 1916
  - Rubidiclivina Baehr, 2015
  - Rugiluclivina Balkenohl, 1996
  - Semiclivina Kult, 1947
  - Sinesetosa Balkenohl, 1996
  - Syleter Andrewes, 1941
  - Trilophidius Jeannel, 1957
  - Trilophus Andrewes, 1927
  - Trogloclivina Deuve, 2003
  - Whiteheadiana Perrault, 1994
- Subtribe Forcipatorina Bänninger, 1938
  - Camptidius Putzeys, 1867
  - Camptodontus Dejean, 1826
  - Forcipator Maindron, 1904
  - Kultianella Perrault, 1994
  - Mesus Chevrolat, 1858
  - Obadius Burmeister, 1875
  - Oxygnathopsis Louwerens, 1953
  - Oxygnathus Dejean, 1826
  - Scolyptus Putzeys, 1861
  - Stratiotes Putzeys, 1846
- Subtribe Reicheiina Jeannel, 1957
  - Alpiodytes Jeannel, 1957
  - Asioreicheia Bulirsch & Magrini, 2014
  - Catalanodytes Sciaky, 1989
  - Dalmatoreicheia Magrini & Bulirsch, 2005
  - Dimorphoreicheia Magrini; Fancello & Leo, 2002
  - Galicioreicheia Felix & Bulirsch, 2015
  - Guiodytes Tian, 2013
  - Gymnetoreicheia Magrini; Fancello & Casale, 2019
  - Iberodytes Jeannel, 1949
  - Ichnusodytes Magrini; Fancello & Onnis, 2019
  - Italodytes G.Müller, 1938
  - Kenyoreicheia Bulirsch & Magrini, 2007
  - Laoreicheia Balkenohl, 2005
  - Madagascareicheia Magrini & Bulirsch, 2009
  - Malagasyreicheia Magrini; Bulirsch & Fancello, 2021
  - Orientoreicheia Bulirsch & Hurka, 1994
  - Oxydrepanus Putzeys, 1867
  - Parareicheia Jeannel, 1957
  - Reicheadella Reitter, 1913
  - Reicheia Saulcy, 1862
  - Reicheidius Jeannel, 1957
  - Sikelioreicheia Magrini & Fancello, 2019
  - Spelaeodytes L.Miller, 1863
  - Typhloreicheia Holdhaus, 1924
- Subtribe Schizogeniina Dostal, 2017
  - Baehrogenius Dostal, 2017
  - Coryza Putzeys, 1867
  - Halocoryza Alluaud, 1919
  - Lophocoryza Alluaud, 1941
  - Paracoryza Basilewsky, 1952
  - Psammocoryza Hogan, 2006
  - Schizogenius Putzeys, 1846
- Subtribe Sparostesina Dostal, 2017
  - Bohemaniella Bousquet, 2002
  - Pseudoclivina Kult, 1947
  - Sparostes Putzeys, 1867
- Subtribe Thliboclivinina Balkenohl, 2022
  - Thliboclivina Kult, 1959
  - Eoclivina Kult, 1959
  - Physoclivina Kult, 1959
  - Sulciclivina Balkenohl, 2022

Tribe Corintascarini Basilewsky, 1973

- Corintascaris Basilewsky, 1952

Tribe Dyschiriini Kolbe, 1880

- Akephorus LeConte, 1852
- Caledyschirius Bulirsch, 2010
- Clivinopsis Bedel, 1895
- Cribrodyschirius Bruneau de Miré, 1952
- Dyschirius Bonelli, 1810
- Neodyschirius Kult, 1954
- Reicheiodes Ganglbauer, 1891
- Setodyschirius Fedorenko, 1996
- Striganoviella Fedorenko, 2012
- Torretassoa Schatzmayr & Koch, 1933
- †Dyschiriomimus Iablokoff-Khnzorian, 1960

Tribe Salcediini Alluaud, 1930

- Holoprizus Putzeys, 1867
- Salcedia Fairmaire, 1899
- Solenogenys Westwood, 1859

Tribe Scaritini Bonelli, 1810

- Subtribe Carenina W.J.MacLeay, 1887
  - Carenidium Chaudoir, 1868
  - Carenum Bonelli, 1813
  - Epilectus Blackburn, 1888
  - Euryscaphus W.J.MacLeay, 1865
  - Laccopterum W.J.MacLeay, 1878
  - Monocentrum Chaudoir, 1868
  - Mouhotia Laporte, 1862
  - Neocarenum Laporte, 1867
  - Neoscaphus Sloane, 1888
  - Philoscaphus W.J.MacLeay, 1871
  - Scaraphites Westwood, 1842
  - Trichocarenum Blackburn, 1892
- Subtribe Pasimachina Putzeys, 1867
  - Pasimachus Bonelli, 1813
- Subtribe Scapterina Putzeys, 1867
  - Acanthoscelis Dejean, 1825
  - Oxylobus Chaudoir, 1855
  - Parathlibops Basilewsky, 1958
  - Passalidius Chaudoir, 1863
  - Scapterus Dejean, 1826
  - Steganomma W.J.MacLeay, 1887
  - Thlibops Putzeys, 1867
- Subtribe Scaritina Bonelli, 1810
  - Anomophaenus Fauvel, 1882
  - Antilliscaris Lorenz, 1998
  - Baenningeria Reichardt, 1976
  - Coptolobus Chaudoir, 1857
  - Crepidopterus Chaudoir, 1855
  - Cryptoscaphus Chaudoir, 1855
  - Dinoscaris Alluaud, 1902
  - Distichus Motschulsky, 1858
  - Dyscaris Bänninger, 1940
  - Dyscherinus Jeannel, 1955
  - Dyscherus Chaudoir, 1855
  - Geoscaptus Chaudoir, 1855
  - Glyptogrus Bates, 1875
  - Gnaphon Andrewes, 1920
  - Haplogaster Chaudoir, 1879
  - Haplotrachelus Chaudoir, 1855
  - Macromorphus Chaudoir, 1857
  - Madascaris Bänninger, 1938
  - Mamboicus Bates, 1886
  - Mecynoscaris Alluaud, 1930
  - Menigius Chaudoir, 1879
  - Neochryopus Bänninger, 1932
  - Ochyropus Schiödte, 1847
  - Pachyodontus Chaudoir, 1879
  - Paradyscherus Basilewsky, 1971
  - Pilades Heyne, 1895
  - Prodyscherodes Jeannel, 1955
  - Prodyscherus Jeannel, 1946
  - Scarites Fabricius, 1775
  - Soesilascarites Makhan, 2010
  - Storthodontus Chaudoir, 1855
  - Tapinoscaris Jeannel, 1946
  - Tibioscarites Bänninger, 1929
  - Tonkinoscaris Bänninger, 1956
  - Typhloscaris Kuntzen, 1914
