= Trichocarenum =

Scientific classification
- Kingdom: Animalia
- Phylum: Arthropoda
- Class: Insecta
- Order: Coleoptera
- Suborder: Adephaga
- Family: Carabidae
- Subfamily: Scaritinae
- Genus: Trichocarenum; Blackburn, 1892

Genus of beetles

Trichocarenum is a genus of beetles in the family Carabidae, containing the following species:

- Trichocarenum castelnaui Sloane, 1905
- Trichocarenum cylindricum Sloane, 1897
- Trichocarenum elderi Blackburn, 1892
