= Rhysocara =

Rhysocara crassa

Scientific classification
- Kingdom: Animalia
- Phylum: Arthropoda
- Class: Insecta
- Order: Coleoptera
- Suborder: Adephaga
- Family: Carabidae
- Subfamily: Scaritinae
- Genus: Rhysocara; Sloane, 1916
- Species: R. crassa

Binomial name
- Rhysocara crassa Sloane, 1916

Genus of beetles

Rhysocara crassa is a species of beetle in the family Carabidae, the only species in the genus Rhysocara.
