= Glyptogrus =

Scientific classification
- Domain: Eukaryota
- Kingdom: Animalia
- Phylum: Arthropoda
- Class: Insecta
- Order: Coleoptera
- Suborder: Adephaga
- Family: Carabidae
- Subfamily: Scaritinae
- Tribe: Scaritini
- Subtribe: Scaritina
- Genus: Glyptogrus; Bates, 1875

Synonyms
- Glyptogaster Chaudoir, 1880; Holcogaster Chaudoir, 1879; Lioscarites Maindron, 1904

Genus of beetles

Glyptogrus is a genus in the ground beetle family Carabidae. There are about seven described species in Glyptogrus, found in South America.

== Species ==
These seven species belong to the genus Glyptogrus:

- Glyptogrus aequatorius (Chaudoir, 1855) (Brazil)
- Glyptogrus bidentatus Bänninger, 1956 (Brazil)
- Glyptogrus boliviensis (Chaudoir, 1879) (Bolivia)
- Glyptogrus glypticus (Perty, 1830) (Brazil)
- Glyptogrus molopinus (Perty, 1830) (Bolivia, Paraguay, Colombia, Guyana, French Guiana, and Brazil)
- Glyptogrus porosus Bänninger, 1935 (Brazil)
- Glyptogrus sulcipennis (Chaudoir, 1879) (Brazil)
