= Baenningeria =

Scientific classification
- Kingdom: Animalia
- Phylum: Arthropoda
- Class: Insecta
- Order: Coleoptera
- Suborder: Adephaga
- Family: Carabidae
- Subfamily: Scaritinae
- Genus: Baenningeria; H Reichardt, 1976

Genus of beetles

Baenningeria is a genus of beetles in the family Carabidae, containing the following species:

- Baenningeria galapagoensis Linell, 1898
- Baenningeria williamsi Van Dyke, 1953
