= Menigius =

Scientific classification
- Domain: Eukaryota
- Kingdom: Animalia
- Phylum: Arthropoda
- Class: Insecta
- Order: Coleoptera
- Suborder: Adephaga
- Family: Carabidae
- Subfamily: Scaritinae
- Tribe: Scaritini
- Subtribe: Scaritina
- Genus: Menigius; Chaudoir, 1879

Synonyms
- Aristodacnus Maindron, 1904; Aulacillus Bates, 1889; Macrotelus Chaudoir, 1879

Genus of beetles

Menigius is a genus in the ground beetle family Carabidae. There are about nine described species in Menigius, found in Africa.

== Species ==
These nine species belong to the genus Menigius:

- Menigius burgeoni Bänninger, 1932 (Cameroon, DR Congo, Rwanda)
- Menigius camerunensis Bänninger, 1929 (Cameroon, Central African Republic, Congo, DR Congo)
- Menigius congoensis Bänninger, 1929 (Chad, Cameroon, Congo, DR Congo)
- Menigius hintzi Bänninger, 1929 (Cameroon, Equatorial Guinea, DR Congo, Uganda, Rwanda)
- Menigius liberianus (H. W. Bates, 1889) (Liberia)
- Menigius phillipsi Bänninger, 1929 (Tanzania, Mozambique)
- Menigius rotundicollis (A. D. Murray, 1857) (Nigeria, Cameroon, Equatorial Guinea)
- Menigius schaumi Chaudoir, 1881 (Ghana, Gabon, DR Congo)
- Menigius sulciger (Chaudoir, 1881) (Guinea, Sierra Leone, Ivory Coast, Gabon, DR Congo, Tanzania)
