= Whiteheadiana =

Scientific classification
- Kingdom: Animalia
- Phylum: Arthropoda
- Class: Insecta
- Order: Coleoptera
- Suborder: Adephaga
- Family: Carabidae
- Subfamily: Scaritinae
- Genus: Whiteheadiana; Perrault, 1994

Genus of beetles

Whiteheadiana is a genus of beetles in the family Carabidae, containing the following species:

- Whiteheadiana latidens (Putzeys, 1861)
- Whiteheadiana longicollis (Putzeys, 1861)
- Whiteheadiana minor (Putzeys, 1866)
- Whiteheadiana stenocephala (Brulle, 1837)
