= Basilewskyana =

Basilewskyana villiersi

Scientific classification
- Kingdom: Animalia
- Phylum: Arthropoda
- Class: Insecta
- Order: Coleoptera
- Suborder: Adephaga
- Family: Carabidae
- Subfamily: Scaritinae
- Genus: Basilewskyana; Kult, 1959
- Species: B. villiersi

Binomial name
- Basilewskyana villiersi (Basilewsky, 1948)

Genus of beetles

Basilewskyana villiersi is a species of beetle in the family Carabidae, the only species in the genus Basilewskyana.
