= Soesilascarites =

Soesilascarites aschnae

Scientific classification
- Kingdom: Animalia
- Phylum: Arthropoda
- Class: Insecta
- Order: Coleoptera
- Suborder: Adephaga
- Family: Carabidae
- Subfamily: Scaritinae
- Genus: Soesilascarites; Makhan, 2010
- Species: S. aschnae

Binomial name
- Soesilascarites aschnae Makhan, 2010

Genus of beetles

Soesilascarites aschnae is a species of beetle in the family Carabidae, the only species in the genus Soesilascarites. It is found in Suriname, South America.
