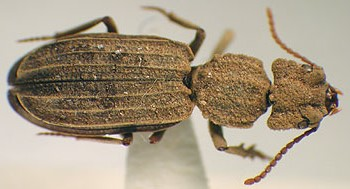
- Solenogenys funkei

Scientific classification
- Kingdom: Animalia
- Phylum: Arthropoda
- Class: Insecta
- Order: Coleoptera
- Suborder: Adephaga
- Family: Carabidae
- Subfamily: Scaritinae
- Tribe: Salcediini
- Subtribe: Solenogenyina
- Genus: Solenogenys; Westwood, 1859

Synonyms
- Aulacinia J.Thomson, 1858

= Solenogenys =

Genus of beetles

Solenogenys is a genus in the ground beetle family Carabidae. There are at least three described species in Solenogenys, found in Brazil.

== Species ==
These three species belong to the genus Solenogenys:

- Solenogenys funkei Adis, 1981
- Solenogenys rhysodoides (J.Thomson, 1858)
- Solenogenys thomsoni Reichardt, 1975
