= Tibioscarites =

Scientific classification
- Kingdom: Animalia
- Phylum: Arthropoda
- Class: Insecta
- Order: Coleoptera
- Suborder: Adephaga
- Family: Carabidae
- Subfamily: Scaritinae
- Genus: Tibioscarites; Banninger, 1929

Genus of beetles

Tibioscarites is a genus of beetles in the family Carabidae, containing the following species:

- Tibioscarites excisomandibularis Banninger, 1929
- Tibioscarites uluguruanus Basilewsky, 1976
