= Bohemaniella =

Scientific classification
- Kingdom: Animalia
- Phylum: Arthropoda
- Class: Insecta
- Order: Coleoptera
- Suborder: Adephaga
- Family: Carabidae
- Subfamily: Scaritinae
- Genus: Bohemaniella; Bousquet, 2002

Genus of beetles

Bohemaniella is a genus of beetles in the family Carabidae, containing the following species:

- Bohemaniella africana (Putzeys, 1876)
- Bohemaniella brevilobis (H. W. Bates, 1886)
- Bohemaniella gigantea (Boheman, 1848)
- Bohemaniella minor (Péringuey, 1896)
