= Steganomma =

Steganomma porcatum

Scientific classification
- Kingdom: Animalia
- Phylum: Arthropoda
- Class: Insecta
- Order: Coleoptera
- Suborder: Adephaga
- Family: Carabidae
- Subfamily: Scaritinae
- Genus: Steganomma; W. J. MacLeay, 1887

Genus of beetles

Steganomma is a genus of beetle in the family Carabidae. It contains the following species:

- Steganomma carteri Baehr, 2006
- Steganomma doddi Baehr, 2006
- Steganomma porcatum W. J. MacLeay, 1887
