= Reicheadella =

Scientific classification
- Kingdom: Animalia
- Phylum: Arthropoda
- Class: Insecta
- Order: Coleoptera
- Suborder: Adephaga
- Family: Carabidae
- Subfamily: Scaritinae
- Tribe: Clivinini
- Subtribe: Reicheiina
- Genus: Reicheadella; Reitter, 1913

Subgenera
- Chaetomargoreicheia Magrini & Bulirsch, 2005; Reicheadella Reitter, 1913

Genus of beetles

Reicheadella is a genus in the ground beetle family Carabidae. There are about nine described species in Reicheadella, found in Europe.

== Species ==
These nine species belong to the genus Reicheadella:

- Reicheadella aetolica Giachino & Vailati, 2004 (Greece)
- Reicheadella bischoffi (Meschnigg, 1933) (Albania, Greece)
- Reicheadella cephalonica (Winkler, 1911) (Greece)
- Reicheadella corcyrea (Reitter, 1884) (Greece)
- Reicheadella imathiae Casale, Giachino & Jalzic&Vailati, 1998 (Greece)
- Reicheadella lakotai Magrini & Bulirsch, 2005 ((former) Yugoslavia, Montenegro)
- Reicheadella smetanai Bulirsch & Gueorguiev, 2008 (Albania)
- Reicheadella xanthina Casale, Giachino & Jalzic&Vailati, 1998 (Greece)
- Reicheadella zoufali (Reitter, 1913) (Bosnia-Herzegovina)
