= Caledyschirius =

Scientific classification
- Domain: Eukaryota
- Kingdom: Animalia
- Phylum: Arthropoda
- Class: Insecta
- Order: Coleoptera
- Suborder: Adephaga
- Family: Carabidae
- Subfamily: Scaritinae
- Tribe: Dyschiriini
- Genus: Caledyschirius; Bulirsch, 2010

Genus of beetles

Caledyschirius is a genus of beetles in the family Carabidae, found in New Caledonia.

== Species ==
These five species belong to the genus Caledyschirius:

- Caledyschirius baehri Bulirsch, 2010
- Caledyschirius bicolor Bulirsch, 2010
- Caledyschirius burwelli Bulirsch, 2010
- Caledyschirius monteithi Bulirsch, 2010
- Caledyschirius rufithorax Bulirsch, 2010
