= Sparostes =

Scientific classification
- Domain: Eukaryota
- Kingdom: Animalia
- Phylum: Arthropoda
- Class: Insecta
- Order: Coleoptera
- Suborder: Adephaga
- Family: Carabidae
- Subfamily: Scaritinae
- Tribe: Clivinini
- Subtribe: Sparostesina
- Genus: Sparostes; Putzeys, 1867

Genus of beetles

Sparostes is a genus in the ground beetle family Carabidae. There are at least two described species in Sparostes, found in Asia.

== Species ==
These two species belong to the genus Sparostes:

- Sparostes brevicollis Putzeys, 1867 (China, India)
- Sparostes striatulus Putzeys, 1867 (China, Bangladesh, India, Myanmar, Thailand, Vietnam)
