= Dyscaris =

Scientific classification
- Domain: Eukaryota
- Kingdom: Animalia
- Phylum: Arthropoda
- Class: Insecta
- Order: Coleoptera
- Suborder: Adephaga
- Family: Carabidae
- Subfamily: Scaritinae
- Tribe: Scaritini
- Subtribe: Scaritina
- Genus: Dyscaris; Bänninger, 1940

Genus of beetles

Dyscaris is a genus in the ground beetle family Carabidae. There are at least four described species in Dyscaris, found in Madagascar.

== Species ==
These four species belong to the genus Dyscaris:

- Dyscaris decorsei Jeannel, 1946
- Dyscaris mordax (Fairmaire, 1869)
- Dyscaris seyrigi (Bänninger, 1934)
- Dyscaris striolifrons (Fairmaire, 1901)
