= Psilidius =

Scientific classification
- Domain: Eukaryota
- Kingdom: Animalia
- Phylum: Arthropoda
- Class: Insecta
- Order: Coleoptera
- Suborder: Adephaga
- Family: Carabidae
- Subfamily: Scaritinae
- Tribe: Clivinini
- Subtribe: Clivinina
- Genus: Psilidius; Jeannel, 1957

Genus of beetles

Psilidius is a genus in the ground beetle family Carabidae. There are at least two described species in Psilidius, found in Africa.

== Species ==
These two species belong to the genus Psilidius:

- Psilidius bredoi (Burgeon, 1935) (Central African Republic, Gabon, Congo, DR Congo)
- Psilidius minutus Basilewsky, 1959 (DR Congo)
