= Kearophus =

Scientific classification
- Domain: Eukaryota
- Kingdom: Animalia
- Phylum: Arthropoda
- Class: Insecta
- Order: Coleoptera
- Suborder: Adephaga
- Family: Carabidae
- Subfamily: Scaritinae
- Tribe: Clivinini
- Subtribe: Ardistomina
- Genus: Kearophus; Dajoz, 2004
- Species: K. guyanensis

Binomial name
- Kearophus guyanensis Dajoz, 2004

Genus of beetles

Kearophus is a genus in the beetle family Carabidae. This genus has a single species, Kearophus guyanensis, found in Guyana.
