= Parareicheia =

Scientific classification
- Domain: Eukaryota
- Kingdom: Animalia
- Phylum: Arthropoda
- Class: Insecta
- Order: Coleoptera
- Suborder: Adephaga
- Family: Carabidae
- Subfamily: Scaritinae
- Tribe: Clivinini
- Subtribe: Reicheiina
- Genus: Parareicheia; Jeannel, 1957

Genus of beetles

Parareicheia is a genus in the ground beetle family Carabidae. There are at least three described species in Parareicheia.

== Species ==
These three species belong to the genus Parareicheia:

- Parareicheia lencinai Ortuño & Magrini, 2006 (Spain)
- Parareicheia nevesi (Jeannel, 1957) (Portugal)
- Parareicheia zoiai (Sciaky, 1989) (Spain)
