= Cryptoscaphus =

Scientific classification
- Domain: Eukaryota
- Kingdom: Animalia
- Phylum: Arthropoda
- Class: Insecta
- Order: Coleoptera
- Suborder: Adephaga
- Family: Carabidae
- Subfamily: Scaritinae
- Tribe: Scaritini
- Subtribe: Scaritina
- Genus: Cryptoscaphus; Chaudoir, 1855

Genus of beetles

Cryptoscaphus is a genus in the ground beetle family Carabidae. There are at least two described species in Cryptoscaphus.

== Species ==
These two species belong to the genus Cryptoscaphus:

- Cryptoscaphus lissonotus Chaudoir, 1855
- Cryptoscaphus russoi Gi. Muller, 1942 (Somalia)
