= Lachenus =

Lachenus impunctipennis

Scientific classification
- Kingdom: Animalia
- Phylum: Arthropoda
- Class: Insecta
- Order: Coleoptera
- Suborder: Adephaga
- Family: Carabidae
- Subfamily: Scaritinae
- Genus: Lachenus; Putzeys, 1846
- Species: L. impunctipennis

Binomial name
- Lachenus impunctipennis Putzeys, 1846

Genus of beetles

Lachenus impunctipennis is a species of beetle in the family Carabidae, the only species in the genus Lachenus.
