= Cribrodyschirius =

Scientific classification
- Domain: Eukaryota
- Kingdom: Animalia
- Phylum: Arthropoda
- Class: Insecta
- Order: Coleoptera
- Suborder: Adephaga
- Family: Carabidae
- Subfamily: Scaritinae
- Tribe: Dyschiriini
- Genus: Cribrodyschirius; Bruneau de Miré, 1952

Genus of beetles

Cribrodyschirius is a genus in the beetle family Carabidae. There are about 11 described species in Cribrodyschirius, found in Africa and Asia.

== Species ==
These 11 species belong to the genus Cribrodyschirius:

- Cribrodyschirius congoensis (Rousseau, 1905)
- Cribrodyschirius demeyeri Bulirsch, 2013
- Cribrodyschirius dostalianus Bulirsch, 2013
- Cribrodyschirius drumonti Bulirsch, 2013
- Cribrodyschirius gibbicollis (Fairmaire, 1897)
- Cribrodyschirius guineensis Fedorenko, 1999
- Cribrodyschirius jeanneli (Basilewsky, 1948)
- Cribrodyschirius mocquerysi (Jeannel, 1946)
- Cribrodyschirius porosus Putzeys, 1877
- Cribrodyschirius puncticollis (Péringuey, 1896)
- Cribrodyschirius schuelei Bulirsch & Magrini, 2019
