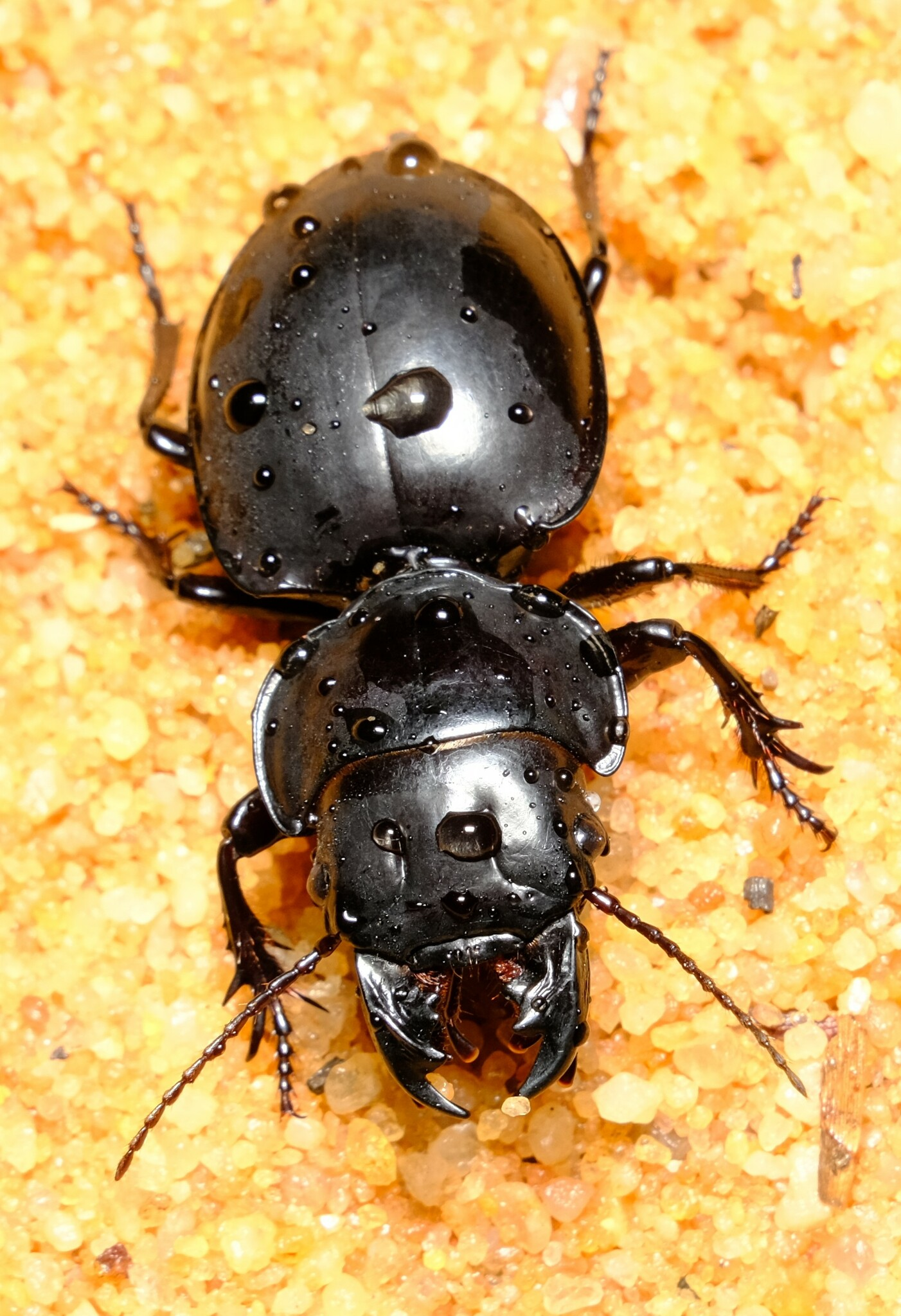
- Euryscaphus obesus, Australia

Scientific classification
- Domain: Eukaryota
- Kingdom: Animalia
- Phylum: Arthropoda
- Class: Insecta
- Order: Coleoptera
- Suborder: Adephaga
- Family: Carabidae
- Subfamily: Scaritinae
- Tribe: Scaritini
- Subtribe: Carenina
- Genus: Euryscaphus; W.J.MacLeay, 1865

= Euryscaphus =

Genus of beetles

Euryscaphus is a genus in the ground beetle family Carabidae. There are about seven described species in Euryscaphus, found in Australia.

== Species ==
These seven species belong to the genus Euryscaphus:

- Euryscaphus angulatus W. J. MacLeay, 1865
- Euryscaphus atratus Sloane, 1894
- Euryscaphus carbonarius (Laporte, 1867)
- Euryscaphus dilatatus W. J. Macleay, 1865
- Euryscaphus obesus (W. J. Macleay, 1863)
- Euryscaphus subsulcatus Blackburn, 1888
- Euryscaphus waterhousei (W. J. Macleay, 1864)
