= Geoscaptus =

Scientific classification
- Domain: Eukaryota
- Kingdom: Animalia
- Phylum: Arthropoda
- Class: Insecta
- Order: Coleoptera
- Suborder: Adephaga
- Family: Carabidae
- Subfamily: Scaritinae
- Tribe: Scaritini
- Subtribe: Scaritina
- Genus: Geoscaptus; Chaudoir, 1855

Genus of beetles

Geoscaptus is a genus of beetles in the family Carabidae, containing the following species:

- Geoscaptus cacus (W. J. Macleay, 1863) (Indonesia, New Guinea, and Australia)
- Geoscaptus crassus Sloane, 1895 (Australia)
- Geoscaptus laevissimus Chaudoir, 1855 (Australia)
- Geoscaptus macleayi Chaudoir, 1879 (Australia)
- Geoscaptus plicatulus (Laporte, 1867) (Australia)

== Parasites ==
In Australia, Geoscaptus laevissimus is parasitized by a species of mite, Eutarsopolipus paryavae which dwells under the elytra.
