= Leleuporella =

Scientific classification
- Domain: Eukaryota
- Kingdom: Animalia
- Phylum: Arthropoda
- Class: Insecta
- Order: Coleoptera
- Suborder: Adephaga
- Family: Carabidae
- Subfamily: Scaritinae
- Tribe: Clivinini
- Subtribe: Clivinina
- Genus: Leleuporella; Basilewsky, 1956

Genus of beetles

Leleuporella is a genus in the ground beetle family Carabidae. There are about six described species in Leleuporella.

== Species ==
These six species belong to the genus Leleuporella:

- Leleuporella caeca Basilewsky, 1956 (DR Congo)
- Leleuporella devagiriensis Abhita & Sabu, 2009 (India)
- Leleuporella gabonensis Bulirsch & Magrini, 2019 (Gabon)
- Leleuporella mandibularis (Burgeon, 1935) (DR Congo)
- Leleuporella sexangulata Balkenohl, 1997 (Sri Lanka)
- Leleuporella tuberculata Fedorenko, 2012 (Vietnam)
