= Stratiotes (beetle) =

Scientific classification
- Kingdom: Animalia
- Phylum: Arthropoda
- Class: Insecta
- Order: Coleoptera
- Suborder: Adephaga
- Family: Carabidae
- Subfamily: Scaritinae
- Tribe: Clivinini
- Subtribe: Forcipatorina
- Genus: Stratiotes; Putzeys, 1846

Genus of beetles

Stratiotes is a genus of beetles in the family Carabidae, containing the following species:

- Stratiotes batesi Putzeys, 1866
- Stratiotes clivinoides (Laporte, 1832)
- Stratiotes iracundus Putzeys, 1861
