= Nannoryctes =

Nannoryctes sulcaticeps

Scientific classification
- Kingdom: Animalia
- Phylum: Arthropoda
- Class: Insecta
- Order: Coleoptera
- Suborder: Adephaga
- Family: Carabidae
- Subfamily: Scaritinae
- Genus: Nannoryctes; M. Baehr, 2000
- Species: N. sulcaticeps

Binomial name
- Nannoryctes sulcaticeps M. Baehr, 2000

Genus of beetles

Nannoryctes sulcaticeps is a species of beetle in the family Carabidae, the only species in the genus Nannoryctes.
