= Carenidium (beetle) =

Scientific classification
- Domain: Eukaryota
- Kingdom: Animalia
- Phylum: Arthropoda
- Class: Insecta
- Order: Coleoptera
- Suborder: Adephaga
- Family: Carabidae
- Subfamily: Scaritinae
- Tribe: Scaritini
- Subtribe: Carenina
- Genus: Carenidium; Chaudoir, 1868

Synonyms
- Conopterum Chaudoir, 1868

Genus of beetles

Carenidium is a genus of ground beetles in the family Carabidae. There are more than 20 described species in Carenidium, found in Australia.

== Species ==
These 22 species belong to the genus Carenidium:

- Carenidium aberrans (Sloane, 1897)
- Carenidium atrum Sloane, 1916
- Carenidium bicornutum (W.J.MacLeay, 1887)
- Carenidium bifurcum Sloane, 1916
- Carenidium chaudoirii W.J.MacLeay, 1887
- Carenidium damelii W.J.MacLeay, 1869
- Carenidium darlingense W.J.MacLeay, 1887
- Carenidium frenchi Sloane, 1916
- Carenidium gagatinum (W.J.MacLeay, 1864)
- Carenidium leai Sloane, 1897
- Carenidium longipenne Sloane, 1907
- Carenidium modestum (Sloane, 1888)
- Carenidium mucronatum (W.J.MacLeay, 1866)
- Carenidium pertenue Sloane, 1916
- Carenidium purpuratum Sloane, 1905
- Carenidium pyripenne Sloane, 1900
- Carenidium riverinae (W.J.MacLeay, 1865)
- Carenidium sapphirinum Bates, 1874
- Carenidium septentrionale W.J.MacLeay, 1887
- Carenidium spaldingii W.J.MacLeay, 1878
- Carenidium superbum (Laporte, 1867)
- Carenidium tropicale W.J.MacLeay, 1887
