= Cryptomma =

Cryptomma multistriatum

Scientific classification
- Kingdom: Animalia
- Phylum: Arthropoda
- Class: Insecta
- Order: Coleoptera
- Suborder: Adephaga
- Family: Carabidae
- Subfamily: Scaritinae
- Genus: Cryptomma; Putzeys, 1846
- Species: C. multistriatum

Binomial name
- Cryptomma multistriatum Putzeys, 1846

Genus of beetles

Cryptomma multistriatum is a species of beetle in the family Carabidae, the only species in the genus Cryptomma.
