= Trilophus =

Scientific classification
- Kingdom: Animalia
- Phylum: Arthropoda
- Class: Insecta
- Order: Coleoptera
- Suborder: Adephaga
- Family: Carabidae
- Subfamily: Scaritinae
- Genus: Trilophus; Andrewes, 1927

Genus of beetles

Trilophus is a genus of beetles in the family Carabidae, containing the following species:

- Trilophus acuminatus Balkenohl, 1999
- Trilophus alternans Balkenohl, 1999
- Trilophus appulsus Balkenohl, 1999
- Trilophus arcuatus Balkenohl, 1999
- Trilophus baehri Balkenohl, 1999
- Trilophus birmanicus (Bates, 1892)
- Trilophus convexus Balkenohl, 1999
- Trilophus crinitus Balkenohl, 1999
- Trilophus ellipticus Balkenohl, 1999
- Trilophus elongatus Balkenohl, 1999
- Trilophus fuscus Balkenohl, 1999
- Trilophus hirsutus Balkenohl, 1999
- Trilophus hispidulus (Putzeys, 1866)
- Trilophus imitator Balkenohl, 1999
- Trilophus interpunctatus (Putzeys, 1866)
- Trilophus latiusculus Balkenohl, 1999
- Trilophus loebli Balkenohl, 1999
- Trilophus lompei Balkenohl, 1999
- Trilophus palpireductus Balkenohl, 1999
- Trilophus parallelus Balkenohl, 1999
- Trilophus schawalleri Balkenohl, 1999
- Trilophus schmidti (Putzeys, 1877)
- Trilophus serratulus Balkenohl, 1999
- Trilophus serratus Balkenohl, 1999
- Trilophus setosus Balkenohl, 1999
- Trilophus tonkinensis Balkenohl, 1999
- Trilophus variabilis Balkenohl, 1999
- Trilophus weberi Balkenohl, 1999
