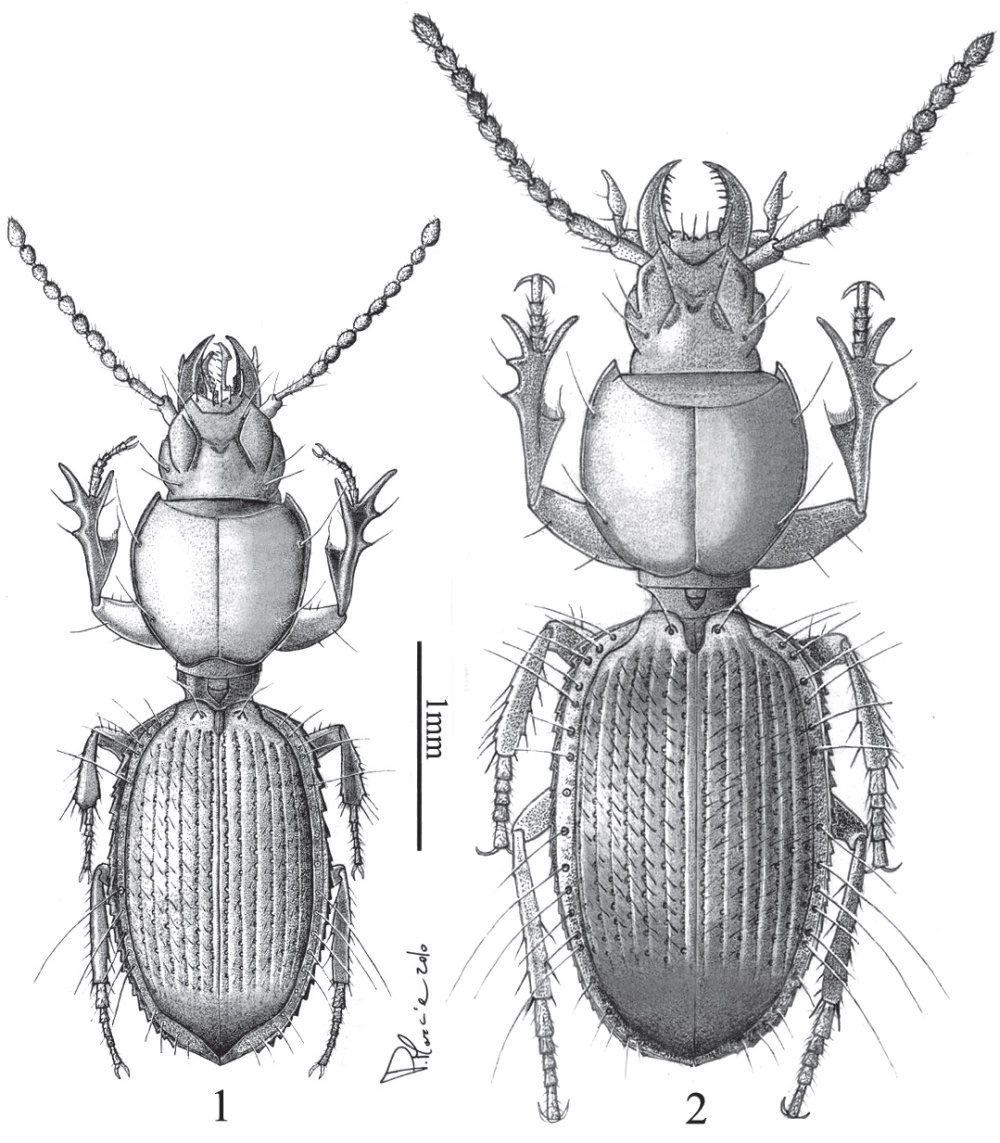
- Typhloreicheia monacha, Typhloreicheia ilianae

Scientific classification
- Domain: Eukaryota
- Kingdom: Animalia
- Phylum: Arthropoda
- Class: Insecta
- Order: Coleoptera
- Suborder: Adephaga
- Family: Carabidae
- Subfamily: Scaritinae
- Tribe: Clivinini
- Subtribe: Reicheiina
- Genus: Typhloreicheia; Holdhaus, 1924

= Typhloreicheia =

Genus of beetles

Typhloreicheia is a genus in the beetle family Carabidae, found mainly in Italy. The species of Typhloreicheia, like most in the subtribe Reicheiina, are generally small, 1-4 mm, and have reduced or absent eyes. They often live below ground and in caves.

There are more than 80 described species in Typhloreicheia.

== Species ==
These 83 species belong to the genus Typhloreicheia:

- Typhloreicheia abbazzii Magrini & Fancello, 2007 (Sardinia)
- Typhloreicheia aliciae Magrini et al, 2020 (Sicily)
- Typhloreicheia andreinii (Dodero, 1916) (Italy)
- Typhloreicheia angelae Magrini, 2003 (Sardinia)
- Typhloreicheia annamariae Magrini, 2002 (Italy)
- Typhloreicheia arganoi Vigna Taglianti, 2001 (Sardinia)
- Typhloreicheia argentierae Magrini & Fancello, 2018 (Sardinia)
- Typhloreicheia bastianinii Magrini, 2002 (Sicily)
- Typhloreicheia belloi Magrini & Baviera, 2011 (Sicily)
- Typhloreicheia benellii Magrini et al, 2015 (Sardinia)
- Typhloreicheia berninii Magrini; Bastianini & Petrioli, 2001 (Sicily)
- Typhloreicheia binaghii Casale, 1985 (Italy)
- Typhloreicheia bulirschi Magrini & Bastianini, 2011 (Sardinia)
- Typhloreicheia carlonnisi Magrini; Marcia & Casale, 2011 (Sardinia)
- Typhloreicheia casalei Magrini; Marcia & Onnis, 2011 (Sardinia)
- Typhloreicheia cirocchii Magrini, 2003 (Sardinia)
- Typhloreicheia colacurcioi Magrini & Paladini, 2014 (Sicily)
- Typhloreicheia consortii Magrini, 2003 (Sardinia)
- Typhloreicheia damone (Holdhaus, 1924) (Italy)
- Typhloreicheia degiovannii Magrini, 2003 (Sardinia)
- Typhloreicheia denticulata (Holdhaus, 1924) (Sardinia)
- Typhloreicheia dewaelei Magrini & Onnis, 2018 (Sardinia)
- Typhloreicheia doderoi (Holdhaus, 1924) (Sardinia)
- Typhloreicheia elegans (Dodero, 1916) (Sardinia)
- Typhloreicheia eleonorae Leo; Magrini & Fancello, 2005 (Sardinia)
- Typhloreicheia elisae Magrini & Onnis, 2016 (Sardinia)
- Typhloreicheia exilis Leo; Magrini & Fancello, 2005 (Sardinia)
- Typhloreicheia fancelloi Magrini, 2000 (Sardinia)
- Typhloreicheia fausti Fancello, 1988 (Sardinia)
- Typhloreicheia flaviae Magrini; Onnis; Marcia & Casale, 2013 (Sardinia)
- Typhloreicheia francescoi Magrini & Onnis, 2019 (Sardinia)
- Typhloreicheia grafittii Magrini; Onnis; Marcia & Casale, 2012 (Sardinia)
- Typhloreicheia henroti Jeannel, 1957 (Sardinia)
- Typhloreicheia holdhausi Magrini; Fancello & Casale, 2006 (Sardinia)
- Typhloreicheia ilianae Casale & Marcia, 2011 (Italy)
- Typhloreicheia ilvensis (Holdhaus, 1924) (Italy)
- Typhloreicheia jana Leo; Magrini & Fancello, 2005 (Sardinia)
- Typhloreicheia jucunda (Holdhaus, 1924) (Sardinia)
- Typhloreicheia kraussei (Reitter, 1914) (Sardinia)
- Typhloreicheia laurentii Magrini, 2004 (Sardinia)
- Typhloreicheia leoi Magrini, 2003 (Sardinia)
- Typhloreicheia maginii Magrini & Vanni, 1990 (Italy)
- Typhloreicheia magrinii Degiovanni; Bastianini & Petrioli, 2010 (Italy)
- Typhloreicheia manto (Holdhaus, 1924) (Sardinia)
- Typhloreicheia martanensis Magrini & Degiovanni, 2007 (Italy)
- Typhloreicheia martelluccii Magrini, 2020 (Italy)
- Typhloreicheia medusa Magrini & Fancello, 2005 (Sardinia)
- Typhloreicheia melonii Magrini, 2000 (Sardinia)
- Typhloreicheia messanae Magrini, 2007 (Sicily)
- Typhloreicheia mingazzinii Magrini & Vanni, 1990 (Italy)
- Typhloreicheia minima (Binaghi, 1936) (Sardinia)
- Typhloreicheia monacha Casale & Marcia, 2011 (Sardinia)
- Typhloreicheia monticola (Holdhaus, 1924) (Sardinia)
- Typhloreicheia montisneronis Binaghi, 1942 (Italy)
- Typhloreicheia musimon Magrini & Onnis, 2016 (Sardinia)
- Typhloreicheia nadiae Magrini, 2003 (Sardinia)
- Typhloreicheia occulta (Holdhaus, 1924) (Sardinia)
- Typhloreicheia onnisi Casale & Magrini, 2003 (Sardinia)
- Typhloreicheia paladinii Magrini; Marcia & Casale, 2011 (Sardinia)
- Typhloreicheia pandora (Holdhaus, 1924) (Sardinia)
- Typhloreicheia parallela (Holdhaus, 1924) (Sardinia)
- Typhloreicheia patronitii Magrini et al, 2020 (Sicily)
- Typhloreicheia pellita Leo; Magrini & Fancello, 2005 (Sardinia)
- Typhloreicheia petriolii Magrini & Fancello, 2007 (Sardinia)
- Typhloreicheia poggii Leo; Magrini & Fancello, 2005 (Sardinia)
- Typhloreicheia praecox (Schaum, 1857) (Sicily)
- Typhloreicheia puddui Magrini; Onnis & Casale, 2019 (Sardinia)
- Typhloreicheia raymondi (Putzeys, 1869) (Sardinia)
- Typhloreicheia regina Leo; Magrini & Fancello, 2005 (Sardinia)
- Typhloreicheia rocchii Magrini & Degiovanni, 2006 (Sardinia)
- Typhloreicheia sanctaerosaliae Magrini et al, 2020 (Sicily)
- Typhloreicheia sardoa (Baudi di Selve, 1891) (Sardinia)
- Typhloreicheia sebera Magrini & Fancello, 2009 (Sardinia)
- Typhloreicheia stefanoi Magrini; Petrioli & Benelli, 2017 (Sicily)
- Typhloreicheia supramontis Leo; Magrini & Fancello, 2005 (Sardinia)
- Typhloreicheia susannae Magrini & Paladini, 2014 (Sicily)
- Typhloreicheia tanit Leo; Magrini & Fancello, 2005 (Sardinia)
- Typhloreicheia tegulae Leo; Magrini & Fancello, 2005 (Sardinia)
- Typhloreicheia usslaubi (Saulcy, 1870) (Italy)
- Typhloreicheia valeriae Fancello, 1988 (Sardinia)
- Typhloreicheia vignai Magrini, 2003 (Sardinia)
- Typhloreicheia viti Magrini & Bulirsch, 2002 (Sardinia)
- Typhloreicheia zingarensis Magrini & Baviera, 2003 (Sicily)
