= Monocentrum =

Scientific classification
- Domain: Eukaryota
- Kingdom: Animalia
- Phylum: Arthropoda
- Class: Insecta
- Order: Coleoptera
- Suborder: Adephaga
- Family: Carabidae
- Subfamily: Scaritinae
- Tribe: Scaritini
- Subtribe: Carenina
- Genus: Monocentrum; Chaudoir, 1868

Synonyms
- Teratidium Bates, 1874

Genus of beetles

Monocentrum is a genus in the ground beetle family Carabidae. There are about 11 described species in Monocentrum, found in Australia.

== Species ==
These 11 species belong to the genus Monocentrum:

- Monocentrum convexum (Sloane, 1905)
- Monocentrum frenchi (Sloane, 1905)
- Monocentrum grandiceps Chaudoir, 1868
- Monocentrum laticeps (Sloane, 1897)
- Monocentrum longiceps Chaudoir, 1868
- Monocentrum macros (H. W. Bates, 1874)
- Monocentrum megacephalum (Hope, 1842)
- Monocentrum parallelum (Sloane, 1923)
- Monocentrum perlongum (Sloane, 1897)
- Monocentrum procerum (Sloane, 1916)
- Monocentrum robustum (Sloane, 1916)
