= Madascaris =

Scientific classification
- Kingdom: Animalia
- Phylum: Arthropoda
- Class: Insecta
- Order: Coleoptera
- Suborder: Adephaga
- Family: Carabidae
- Subfamily: Scaritinae
- Genus: Madascaris; Bänninger, 1937

Genus of beetles

Madascaris is a genus of beetles in the family Carabidae, containing the following species:

- Madascaris casalei Deuve, 2015
- Madascaris centurio Basilewsky, 1980
- Madascaris enoplus (Alluaud, 1930)
- Madascaris marojejyana Basilewsky, 1980
- Madascaris octocostata (Bänninger, 1933)
