= Gnaphon =

Scientific classification
- Kingdom: Animalia
- Phylum: Arthropoda
- Class: Insecta
- Order: Coleoptera
- Suborder: Adephaga
- Family: Carabidae
- Subfamily: Scaritinae
- Genus: Gnaphon; Andrewes, 1920

Genus of beetles

Gnaphon is a genus of beetles in the family Carabidae, containing the following species:

- Gnaphon costatus Andrewes, 1929
- Gnaphon humeralis (Putzeys, 1879)
- Gnaphon loyolae (Fairmaire, 1883)
