= Lophocoryza =

Scientific classification
- Kingdom: Animalia
- Phylum: Arthropoda
- Class: Insecta
- Order: Coleoptera
- Suborder: Adephaga
- Family: Carabidae
- Subfamily: Scaritinae
- Genus: Lophocoryza; Alluaud, 1941

Genus of beetles

Lophocoryza is a genus of beetles in the family Carabidae, containing the following species:

- Lophocoryza araticeps (Fairmaire, 1892)
- Lophocoryza deuvei Balkenohl, 2018
- Lophocoryza hanoti Balkenohl, 2018
- Lophocoryza sciakyi Balkenohl, 2018
- Lophocoryza sechellensis Basilewsky, 1973
- Lophocoryza vadoni Alluaud, 1941
