= Laccopterum =

Scientific classification
- Domain: Eukaryota
- Kingdom: Animalia
- Phylum: Arthropoda
- Class: Insecta
- Order: Coleoptera
- Suborder: Adephaga
- Family: Carabidae
- Subfamily: Scaritinae
- Tribe: Scaritini
- Subtribe: Carenina
- Genus: Laccopterum; W. J. MacLeay, 1887

Genus of beetles

Laccopterum is a genus of beetles in the family Carabidae, found in Australia.

== Species ==
These 16 species belong to the genus Laccopterum:

- Laccopterum cyaneum (Fabricius, 1775)
- Laccopterum darwiniense (W. J. MacLeay, 1878)
- Laccopterum deauratum (W. J. MacLeay, 1864)
- Laccopterum doddi (Sloane, 1916)
- Laccopterum foveigerum (Chaudoir, 1868)
- Laccopterum foveipenne (W. J. MacLeay, 1873)
- Laccopterum foveolatum (W. J. MacLeay, 1864)
- Laccopterum gemmatum (Westwood, 1842)
- Laccopterum humerale Sloane, 1900
- Laccopterum lacunosum W. J. MacLeay, 1887
- Laccopterum loculosum (E. Newman, 1842)
- Laccopterum macleayi Sloane, 1897
- Laccopterum multiimpressum (Laporte, 1867)
- Laccopterum quadriseriatum (Sloane, 1907)
- Laccopterum salebrosum (W. J. MacLeay, 1871)
- Laccopterum spencei Westwood, 1841
