= Mesus =

Scientific classification
- Kingdom: Animalia
- Phylum: Arthropoda
- Class: Insecta
- Order: Coleoptera
- Suborder: Adephaga
- Family: Carabidae
- Subfamily: Scaritinae
- Genus: Mesus; Chevrolat, 1858

Genus of beetles

Mesus is a genus of beetles in the family Carabidae, containing the following species:

- Mesus gigas H. Reichardt, 1974
- Mesus hornburgi Dostal, 2016
- Mesus mesus H. Reichardt, 1974
- Mesus nanus H. Reichardt, 1974
- Mesus pseudogigas L. M. Vieira & A. M. Bello, 2004
- Mesus rugatifrons Chevrolat, 1858
