= Prodyscherus =

Scientific classification
- Domain: Eukaryota
- Kingdom: Animalia
- Phylum: Arthropoda
- Class: Insecta
- Order: Coleoptera
- Suborder: Adephaga
- Family: Carabidae
- Subfamily: Scaritinae
- Tribe: Scaritini
- Subtribe: Scaritina
- Genus: Prodyscherus; Jeannel, 1946

Genus of beetles

Prodyscherus is a genus in the ground beetle family Carabidae. There are more than 20 described species in Prodyscherus, found in Madagascar.

== Species ==
These 21 species belong to the genus Prodyscherus:

- Prodyscherus alluaudi (Bänninger, 1934)
- Prodyscherus androyanus Jeannel, 1946, 1946
- Prodyscherus anosyensis Basilewsky, 1972
- Prodyscherus australis Jeannel, 1946
- Prodyscherus basilewskyi Bulirsch, Janák & P. Moravec, 2005
- Prodyscherus curtipennis (Fairmaire, 1901)
- Prodyscherus decaryi Jeannel, 1946
- Prodyscherus externus (Fairmaire, 1901)
- Prodyscherus grandidieri Jeannel, 1946
- Prodyscherus granulatus Jeannel, 1946
- Prodyscherus mandibularis (Fairmaire, 1901)
- Prodyscherus meridionalis Jeannel, 1955
- Prodyscherus morondavae Basilewsky, 1976
- Prodyscherus nigrita (Bänninger, 1934)
- Prodyscherus ovatus (Bänninger, 1934)
- Prodyscherus pluto (Künckel, 1887)
- Prodyscherus praelongus (Fairmaire, 1898)
- Prodyscherus pseudomandibularis (Bänninger, 1934)
- Prodyscherus rapax (Fairmaire, 1883)
- Prodyscherus rugatus (Bänninger, 1934)
- Prodyscherus sexiessetosus Jeannel, 1946
