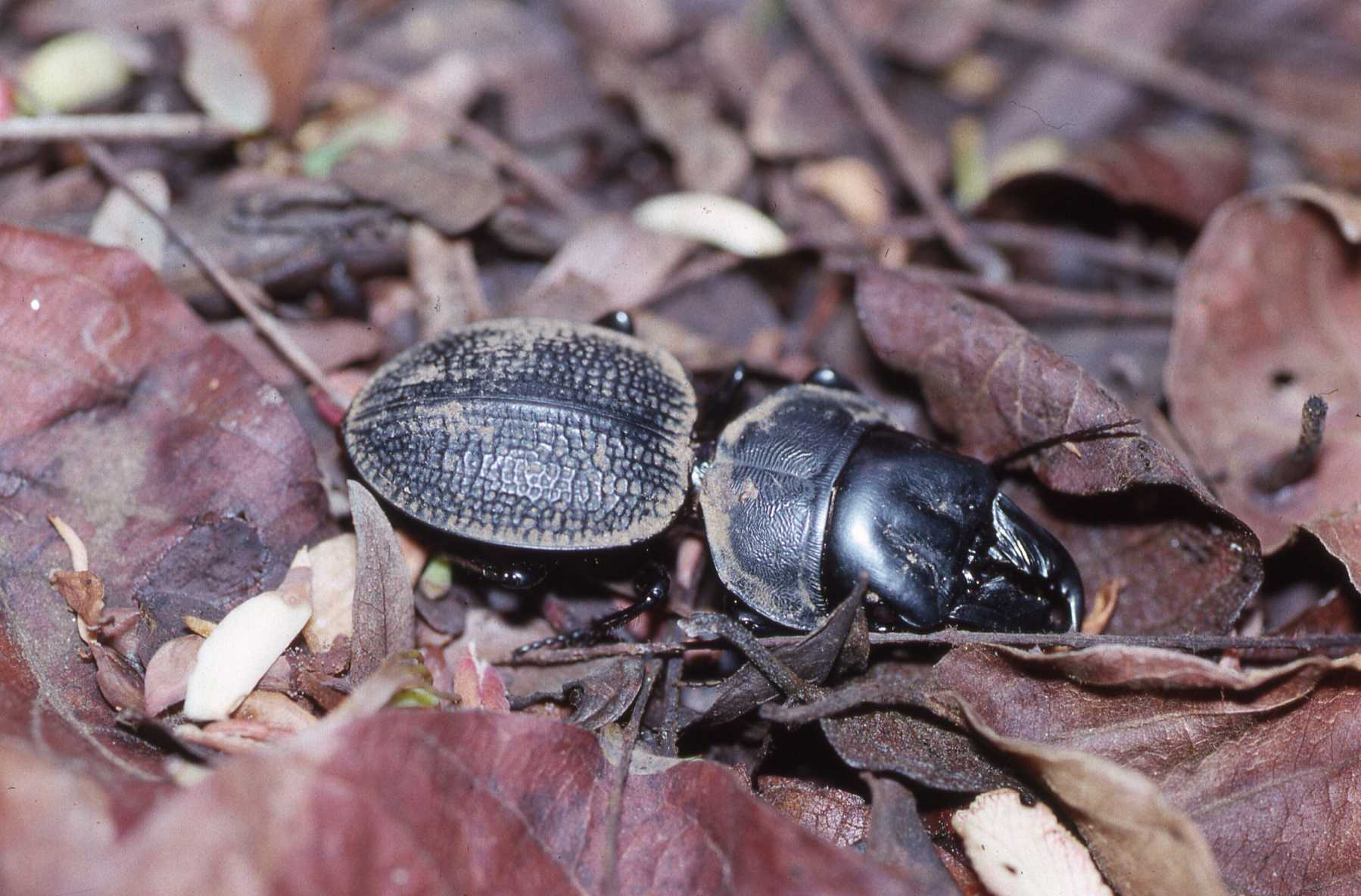
- Crepidopterus, Madagascar

Scientific classification
- Domain: Eukaryota
- Kingdom: Animalia
- Phylum: Arthropoda
- Class: Insecta
- Order: Coleoptera
- Suborder: Adephaga
- Family: Carabidae
- Subfamily: Scaritinae
- Tribe: Scaritini
- Subtribe: Scaritina
- Genus: Crepidopterus; Chaudoir, 1855

= Crepidopterus =

Genus of beetles

Crepidopterus is a genus in the beetle family Carabidae. There are about 13 described species in Crepidopterus, found in Madagascar.

- Crepidopterus arrowi (Banninger, 1934)
- Crepidopterus cordipennis Fairmaire, 1901
- Crepidopterus decorsii (Fairmaire, 1901)
- Crepidopterus descarpentriesi Basilewsky, 1973
- Crepidopterus geayi Jeannel, 1946
- Crepidopterus goudotii (Guerin-Meneville, 1832)
- Crepidopterus mahaboensis Basilewsky, 1976
- Crepidopterus meridionalis Basilewsky, 1973
- Crepidopterus morosus (Banninger, 1934)
- Crepidopterus pipitzii Fairmaire, 1884
- Crepidopterus seyrigi (Alluaud, 1935)
- Crepidopterus sublevipennis (Alluaud, 1930)
- Crepidopterus sublevis Jeannel, 1946
