= Reicheiodes =

Scientific classification
- Kingdom: Animalia
- Phylum: Arthropoda
- Class: Insecta
- Order: Coleoptera
- Suborder: Adephaga
- Family: Carabidae
- Subfamily: Scaritinae
- Genus: Reicheiodes; Ganglbauer, 1891

Genus of beetles

Reicheiodes is a genus of beetles in the family Carabidae, containing the following species:

- Reicheiodes alpicola (Ganglbauer, 1891)
- Reicheiodes assmanni Balkenohl, 1999
- Reicheiodes concameratus Balkenohl & Joa. Schmidt, 2015
- Reicheiodes convexipennis (Balkenohl, 1994)
- Reicheiodes dewaillyi (Kult, 1949)
- Reicheiodes ellipsoideus Balkenohl, 1995
- Reicheiodes fontanae (Bari, 1950)
- Reicheiodes franzi Dostal, 1993
- Reicheiodes igai (Nakane & S. I. Ueno, 1953)
- Reicheiodes jaegeri Balkenohl & Joa. Schmidt, 1997
- Reicheiodes kodoriensis Fedorenko, 1996
- Reicheiodes kulzeri Bulirsch & Fedorenko, 2007
- Reicheiodes lederi (Reitter, 1888)
- Reicheiodes loebli (Balkenohl, 1994)
- Reicheiodes matokai Sei. Morita, 2015
- Reicheiodes meybohmi Balkenohl, 2003
- Reicheiodes microphthalmus (Heyden, 1870)
- Reicheiodes nishii Sei. Morita & Bulirsch, 2010
- Reicheiodes rotundipennis (Chaudoir, 1843)
- Reicheiodes schatzmayri (Bari, 1950)
- Reicheiodes similitudis Balkenohl & Joa. Schmidt, 2015
- Reicheiodes subcirculatus Balkenohl & Joa. Schmidt, 2016
- Reicheiodes taiwanensis Bulirsch, 2018
- Reicheiodes variobasalis Balkenohl & Joa. Schmidt, 2015
- Reicheiodes yanoi (Kult, 1949)
- Reicheiodes yokozekii Sei. Morita, 2015
- Reicheiodes zvarici (Bulirsch, 1990)
