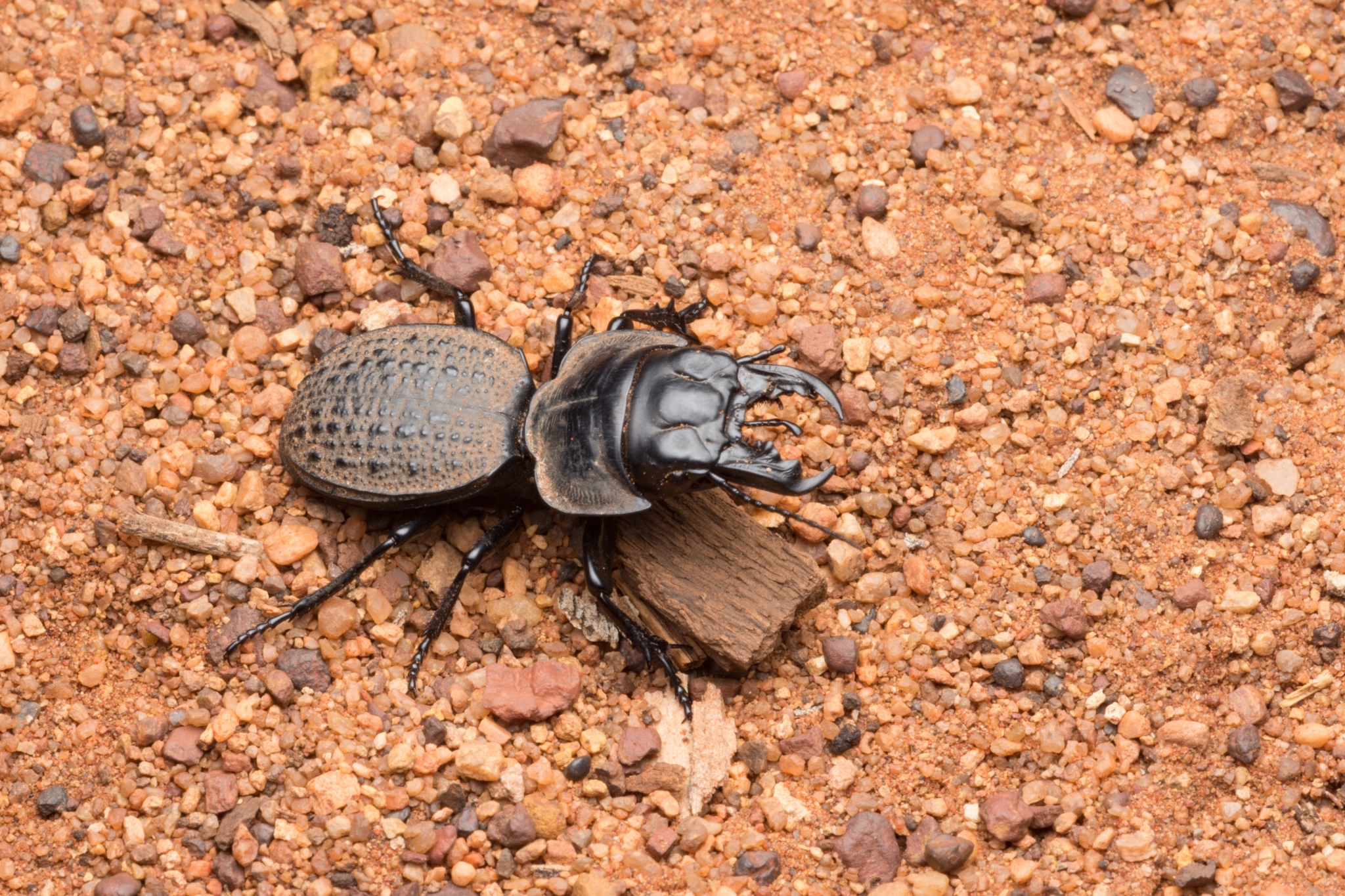
- Philoscaphus, Australia

Scientific classification
- Domain: Eukaryota
- Kingdom: Animalia
- Phylum: Arthropoda
- Class: Insecta
- Order: Coleoptera
- Suborder: Adephaga
- Family: Carabidae
- Subfamily: Scaritinae
- Tribe: Scaritini
- Subtribe: Carenina
- Genus: Philoscaphus; W.J.MacLeay, 1871

= Philoscaphus =

Genus of beetles

Philoscaphus is a genus in the ground beetle family Carabidae. There are about six described species in Philoscaphus, found in Australia.

== Species ==
These six species belong to the genus Philoscaphus:

- Philoscaphus barnardi W.J.MacLeay, 1888
- Philoscaphus bicostatus Sloane, 1905
- Philoscaphus carinatus (W.J.MacLeay, 1864)
- Philoscaphus costalis W.J.MacLeay, 1873
- Philoscaphus mastersii W.J.MacLeay, 1871
- Philoscaphus tuberculatus (W.J.MacLeay, 1863)
