= Alpiodytes =

Scientific classification
- Kingdom: Animalia
- Phylum: Arthropoda
- Class: Insecta
- Order: Coleoptera
- Suborder: Adephaga
- Family: Carabidae
- Subfamily: Scaritinae
- Genus: Alpiodytes; Jeannel, 1957

Genus of beetles

Alpiodytes is a genus of beetles in the family Carabidae, containing the following species which are endemic to Italy:

- Alpiodytes penninus (Binaghi, 1936)
- Alpiodytes ravizzai Sciaky, 1985
