= Dimorphoreicheia =

Scientific classification
- Kingdom: Animalia
- Phylum: Arthropoda
- Class: Insecta
- Order: Coleoptera
- Suborder: Adephaga
- Family: Carabidae
- Subfamily: Scaritinae
- Genus: Dimorphoreicheia; Magrini, Fancello & Leo, 2002

Genus of beetles

Dimorphoreicheia is a genus of beetles in the family Carabidae, containing the following species which are endemic to Sardinia:

- Dimorphoreicheia relicta Magrini, 2004
- Dimorphoreicheia vannii Magrini, Fancello & Leo, 2002
