= Androzelma =

Androzelma gigas

Scientific classification
- Kingdom: Animalia
- Phylum: Arthropoda
- Class: Insecta
- Order: Coleoptera
- Suborder: Adephaga
- Family: Carabidae
- Subfamily: Scaritinae
- Genus: Androzelma; Dostal, 1993
- Species: A. gigas

Binomial name
- Androzelma gigas Dostal, 1993

Genus of beetles

Androzelma gigas is a species of beetle in the family Carabidae, the only species in the genus Androzelma.
