= Dyschiriomimus =

Dyschiriomimus Temporal range: 38–33.9 Ma

Scientific classification
- Domain: Eukaryota
- Kingdom: Animalia
- Phylum: Arthropoda
- Class: Insecta
- Order: Coleoptera
- Suborder: Adephaga
- Family: Carabidae
- Subfamily: Scaritinae
- Tribe: Dyschiriini
- Genus: Dyschiriomimus; Iablokoff-Khnzorian, 1960
- Species: D. stackelbergi

Binomial name
- Dyschiriomimus stackelbergi Iablokoff-Khnzorian, 1960

Genus of beetles

Dyschiriomimus is an extinct genus of ground beetles in the family Carabidae. This genus has a single species, Dyschiriomimus stackelbergi, discovered in Baltic amber in Lithuania. Fossils of this beetle have been dated from 38 to 33.9 million years ago.
