= Mecynoscaris =

Scientific classification
- Domain: Eukaryota
- Kingdom: Animalia
- Phylum: Arthropoda
- Class: Insecta
- Order: Coleoptera
- Suborder: Adephaga
- Family: Carabidae
- Subfamily: Scaritinae
- Tribe: Scaritini
- Subtribe: Scaritina
- Genus: Mecynoscaris; Alluaud, 1930

Genus of beetles

Mecynoscaris is a genus in the ground beetle family Carabidae. There are at least two described species in Mecynoscaris, found in Madagascar.

== Species ==
These two species belong to the genus Mecynoscaris:

- Mecynoscaris ambreana Bänninger, 1933
- Mecynoscaris longula (Fairmaire, 1905)
