= Mamboicus =

Scientific classification
- Kingdom: Animalia
- Phylum: Arthropoda
- Class: Insecta
- Order: Coleoptera
- Suborder: Adephaga
- Family: Carabidae
- Subfamily: Scaritinae
- Genus: Mamboicus; H. W. Bates, 1886

Genus of beetles

Mamboicus is a genus of beetles in the family Carabidae, containing the following species:

- Mamboicus afrellus (H. W. Bates, 1886)
- Mamboicus bittencourtae (Bulirsch, 2021)
- Mamboicus conradti (Bänninger, 1939)
- Mamboicus granulipennis (H. W. Bates, 1886)
- Mamboicus heterosculptus Bänninger, 1929
- Mamboicus hypocrita (Bänninger, 1929)
- Mamboicus langenhani (Bänninger, 1933)
- Mamboicus lastii H. W. Bates, 1886
- Mamboicus methneri Bänninger, 1929
- Mamboicus nguruensis Bulirsch, 2016
- Mamboicus ochryopoides Bänninger, 1929
- Mamboicus semigranulatus (Bänninger, 1929)
