= Typhloscaris =

Scientific classification
- Kingdom: Animalia
- Phylum: Arthropoda
- Class: Insecta
- Order: Coleoptera
- Suborder: Adephaga
- Family: Carabidae
- Subfamily: Scaritinae
- Genus: Typhloscaris; Kuntzen, 1914

Genus of beetles

Typhloscaris is a genus of beetles in the family Carabidae, containing the following species:

- Typhloscaris aberdarensis (Alluaud, 1917)
- Typhloscaris alluaudi (Banninger, 1935)
- Typhloscaris andringitrae Basilewsky, 1971
- Typhloscaris carbonaria (Banninger, 1935)
- Typhloscaris descarpentriesi Basilewsky, 1972
- Typhloscaris elgonensis (Banninger, 1935)
- Typhloscaris gracilis Banninger, 1929
- Typhloscaris hutchinsoni (Alluaud, 1917)
- Typhloscaris insularis (Banninger, 1935)
- Typhloscaris jeanneli (Banninger, 1935)
- Typhloscaris kenyensis (Alluaud, 1917)
- Typhloscaris leleupi (Basilewsky, 1960)
- Typhloscaris macrodus Kuntzen, 1914
- Typhloscaris mamboiana (Bates, 1886)
- Typhloscaris marakwetensis (Banninger, 1935)
- Typhloscaris meruensis Etten, 1984
- Typhloscaris microphthalma Banninger, 1929
- Typhloscaris montana (Banninger, 1932)
- Typhloscaris montivaga (Banninger, 1935)
- Typhloscaris uluguruensis (Banninger, 1935)
- Typhloscaris viettei Basilewsky, 1980
