= Dalmatoreicheia =

Scientific classification
- Domain: Eukaryota
- Kingdom: Animalia
- Phylum: Arthropoda
- Class: Insecta
- Order: Coleoptera
- Suborder: Adephaga
- Family: Carabidae
- Subfamily: Scaritinae
- Tribe: Clivinini
- Subtribe: Reicheiina
- Genus: Dalmatoreicheia; Magrini & Bulirsch, 2005

Genus of beetles

Dalmatoreicheia is a genus in the ground beetle family Carabidae. There are at least two described species in Dalmatoreicheia.

== Species ==
These two species belong to the genus Dalmatoreicheia:

- Dalmatoreicheia janaki Magrini & Bulirsch, 2005 (Croatia)
- Dalmatoreicheia maderi Bulirsch & Gueorguiev, 2008 (Albania)
