= Brachypelus =

Scientific classification
- Kingdom: Animalia
- Phylum: Arthropoda
- Class: Insecta
- Order: Coleoptera
- Suborder: Adephaga
- Family: Carabidae
- Subfamily: Scaritinae
- Genus: Brachypelus; Putzeys, 1866

Genus of beetles

Brachypelus is a genus of beetles in the family Carabidae, containing the following species:

- Brachypelus ambondrombe Bulirsch, Janak & Moravec, 2005
- Brachypelus basilewskyi Bulirsch, Janak & Moravec, 2005
- Brachypelus betsileo Bulirsch, Janak & Moravec, 2005
- Brachypelus fisheri Bulirsch, Janak & Moravec, 2005
- Brachypelus janaki Bulirsch & Moravec, 2009
- Brachypelus microphthalmus Basilewsky, 1980
- Brachypelus minor Alluaud, 1935
- Brachypelus newtoni Bulirsch, Janak & Moravec, 2005
- Brachypelus obesus Putzeys, 1866
- Brachypelus pauliani Basilewsky, 1980
- Brachypelus reticulatus Basilewsky, 1980
- Brachypelus rolandi Bulirsch, Janak & Moravec, 2005
- Brachypelus vohidray Bulirsch, Janak & Moravec, 2005
- Brachypelus vonickai Bulirsch, Janak & Moravec, 2005
