= Afrosyleter =

Scientific classification
- Kingdom: Animalia
- Phylum: Arthropoda
- Clade: Pancrustacea
- Class: Insecta
- Order: Coleoptera
- Suborder: Adephaga
- Family: Carabidae
- Subfamily: Scaritinae
- Tribe: Clivinini
- Subtribe: Clivinina
- Genus: Afrosyleter; Basilewsky, 1959

Genus of beetles

Afrosyleter is a genus in the beetle family Carabidae first described by Kurt Hermann Gustav Otto Noesske in 1928. There are about 10 described species in Afrosyleter, found in Africa.

== Species ==
These 10 species belong to the genus Afrosyleter:

- Afrosyleter angolensis Bulirsch & Magrini, 2018 (Angola)
- Afrosyleter congoensis (Burgeon, 1935) (Congo (Brazzaville), Democratic Republic of the Congo, and Angola)
- Afrosyleter ituricus Basilewsky, 1959 (Democratic Republic of the Congo)
- Afrosyleter leleupi Basilewsky, 1959 (Democratic Republic of the Congo)
- Afrosyleter pauliani Basilewsky, 1959 (Ivory Coast)
- Afrosyleter reticulatus Basilewsky, 1962 (Democratic Republic of the Congo)
- Afrosyleter rossii Bulirsch & Magrini, 2018 (Sierra Leone)
- Afrosyleter serrulatus Basilewsky, 1959 (Democratic Republic of the Congo)
- Afrosyleter szeli Bulirsch & Magrini, 2018 (Mozambique)
- Afrosyleter telnovi Bulirsch & Magrini, 2019 (Gabon)
