= Laoreicheia =

Scientific classification
- Kingdom: Animalia
- Phylum: Arthropoda
- Class: Insecta
- Order: Coleoptera
- Suborder: Adephaga
- Family: Carabidae
- Subfamily: Scaritinae
- Genus: Laoreicheia; Balkenohl, 2005

Genus of beetles

Laoreicheia is a genus of beetle in the family Carabidae.

It contains the following species:

- Laoreicheia bartolozzii Magrini & Bulirsch, 2020
- Laoreicheia bulirschi Balkenohl, 2005
