= Neocarenum =

Scientific classification
- Kingdom: Animalia
- Phylum: Arthropoda
- Class: Insecta
- Order: Coleoptera
- Suborder: Adephaga
- Family: Carabidae
- Subfamily: Scaritinae
- Genus: Neocarenum; Laporte, 1867

Genus of beetles

Neocarenum is a genus of beetles in the family Carabidae, containing the following species:

- Neocarenum angustatum Sloane, 1894
- Neocarenum blackburni Sloane, 1895
- Neocarenum cylindripenne H. W. Bates, 1874
- Neocarenum dingo Sloane, 1916
- Neocarenum elongatum (W. J. Macleay, 1864)
- Neocarenum parviceps Sloane, 1894
- Neocarenum retusum H. W. Bates, 1874
- Neocarenum rugosulum W. J. Macleay, 1869
- Neocarenum singulare Laporte, 1867
- Neocarenum spenceri Sloane, 1897
