= Clivinarchus =

Scientific classification
- Kingdom: Animalia
- Phylum: Arthropoda
- Class: Insecta
- Order: Coleoptera
- Suborder: Adephaga
- Family: Carabidae
- Subfamily: Scaritinae
- Tribe: Clivinini
- Subtribe: Clivinina
- Genus: Clivinarchus; Sloane, 1896
- Species: C. perlongus

Binomial name
- Clivinarchus perlongus Sloane, 1896

Genus of beetles

Clivinarchus is a genus in the ground beetle family Carabidae. This genus has a single species, Clivinarchus perlongus. It is found in Australia.
