= Nyctosyles =

Scientific classification
- Kingdom: Animalia
- Phylum: Arthropoda
- Class: Insecta
- Order: Coleoptera
- Suborder: Adephaga
- Family: Carabidae
- Subfamily: Scaritinae
- Genus: Nyctosyles; Putzeys, 1866

Genus of beetles

Nyctosyles is a genus of beetles in the family Carabidae, containing the following species:

- Nyctosyles laticollis Putzeys, 1866
- Nyctosyles planicollis (Reiche, 1842)
- Nyctosyles quadraticollis (Reiche, 1842)
