= Trilophidius =

Scientific classification
- Domain: Eukaryota
- Kingdom: Animalia
- Phylum: Arthropoda
- Class: Insecta
- Order: Coleoptera
- Suborder: Adephaga
- Family: Carabidae
- Subfamily: Scaritinae
- Tribe: Clivinini
- Subtribe: Clivinina
- Genus: Trilophidius; Jeannel, 1957

Genus of beetles

Trilophidius is a genus in the beetle family Carabidae. There are more than 20 described species in Trilophidius.

== Species ==
These 23 species belong to the genus Trilophidius:

- Trilophidius acastus Grebennikov; Bulirsch & Magrini, 2017 (Equatorial Guinea)
- Trilophidius alluaudi Jeannel, 1957 (Ivory Coast and Benin)
- Trilophidius argus Grebennikov; Bulirsch & Magrini, 2017 (Equatorial Guinea)
- Trilophidius basilewskyi Jeannel, 1957 (Democratic Republic of the Congo)
- Trilophidius bayoni Jeannel, 1957 (Kenya)
- Trilophidius carinatus Balkenohl, 2001 (Indonesia and Borneo)
- Trilophidius cervilineatus Balkenohl, 2001 (China and Vietnam)
- Trilophidius congoanus (Burgeon, 1935) (Congo (Brazzaville), Democratic Republic of the Congo, Angola)
- Trilophidius decorsei Jeannel, 1957 (the Central African Republic)
- Trilophidius devroeyi Jeannel, 1957 (Democratic Republic of the Congo)
- Trilophidius ellenbergeri Jeannel, 1957 (Gabon)
- Trilophidius endroedii Balkenohl, 2001 (Sri Lanka)
- Trilophidius fastigatus Balkenohl, 2001 (India and Myanmar)
- Trilophidius gemmatus Balkenohl, 2018 (Bhutan)
- Trilophidius impunctatus (Putzeys, 1868) (Sri Lanka, India, Myanmar, Thailand, Vietnam, Indonesia)
- Trilophidius itombwanus Jeannel, 1957 (Democratic Republic of the Congo)
- Trilophidius kahuzicus Jeannel, 1957 (Democratic Republic of the Congo)
- Trilophidius leleupi Jeannel, 1957 (Democratic Republic of the Congo)
- Trilophidius minutulus Balkenohl, 2001 (China and Vietnam)
- Trilophidius pallidus (Basilewsky, 1950) (Democratic Republic of the Congo)
- Trilophidius planophthalmus Balkenohl, 2018 (Laos)
- Trilophidius rudebecki (Basilewsky, 1946) (Senegal/ Gambia and Ivory Coast)
- Trilophidius ugandanus Basilewsky, 1962 (Uganda)
