= Anomophaenus =

Scientific classification
- Kingdom: Animalia
- Phylum: Arthropoda
- Class: Insecta
- Order: Coleoptera
- Suborder: Adephaga
- Family: Carabidae
- Subfamily: Scaritinae
- Genus: Anomophaenus; Fauvel, 1882

Genus of beetles

Anomophaenus is a genus of beetles in the family Carabidae, containing the following species: The genus was first described in 1882 by Charles Adolphe Albert Fauvel.

- Anomophaenus costatogranulatus (Chaudoir, 1879)
- Anomophaenus depressiusculus Heller, 1916
- Anomophaenus granellus (Fauvel, 1882)
- Anomophaenus granulipennis Fauvel, 1903
- Anomophaenus montanus Heller, 1916
- Anomophaenus montrousieri Bänninger, 1939
- Anomophaenus plicatifrons Heller, 1916
- Anomophaenus tenuistriatus Heller, 1916
