= Antilliscaris =

Scientific classification
- Kingdom: Animalia
- Phylum: Arthropoda
- Class: Insecta
- Order: Coleoptera
- Suborder: Adephaga
- Family: Carabidae
- Subfamily: Scaritinae
- Genus: Antilliscaris; Bänninger, 1949

Genus of beetles

Antilliscaris is a genus of beetles in the family Carabidae, containing the following species:

- Antilliscaris danforthi (Darlington, 1939)
- Antilliscaris darlingtoni (Bänninger, 1935)
- Antilliscaris megacephala (T. F. Hlavac, 1969)
- Antilliscaris mutchleri (Bänninger, 1939)
