= Coptolobus =

Scientific classification
- Domain: Eukaryota
- Kingdom: Animalia
- Phylum: Arthropoda
- Class: Insecta
- Order: Coleoptera
- Suborder: Adephaga
- Family: Carabidae
- Subfamily: Scaritinae
- Tribe: Scaritini
- Subtribe: Scaritina
- Genus: Coptolobus; Chaudoir, 1857

Genus of beetles

Coptolobus is a genus in the ground beetle family Carabidae. There are about six described species in Coptolobus, found in Sri Lanka.

== Species ==
These six species belong to the genus Coptolobus:

- Coptolobus anodon Chaudoir, 1879
- Coptolobus ater Andrewes, 1936
- Coptolobus glabriculus Chaudoir, 1857
- Coptolobus latus Andrewes, 1923
- Coptolobus lucens Banninger, 1935
- Coptolobus omodon Chaudoir, 1879
