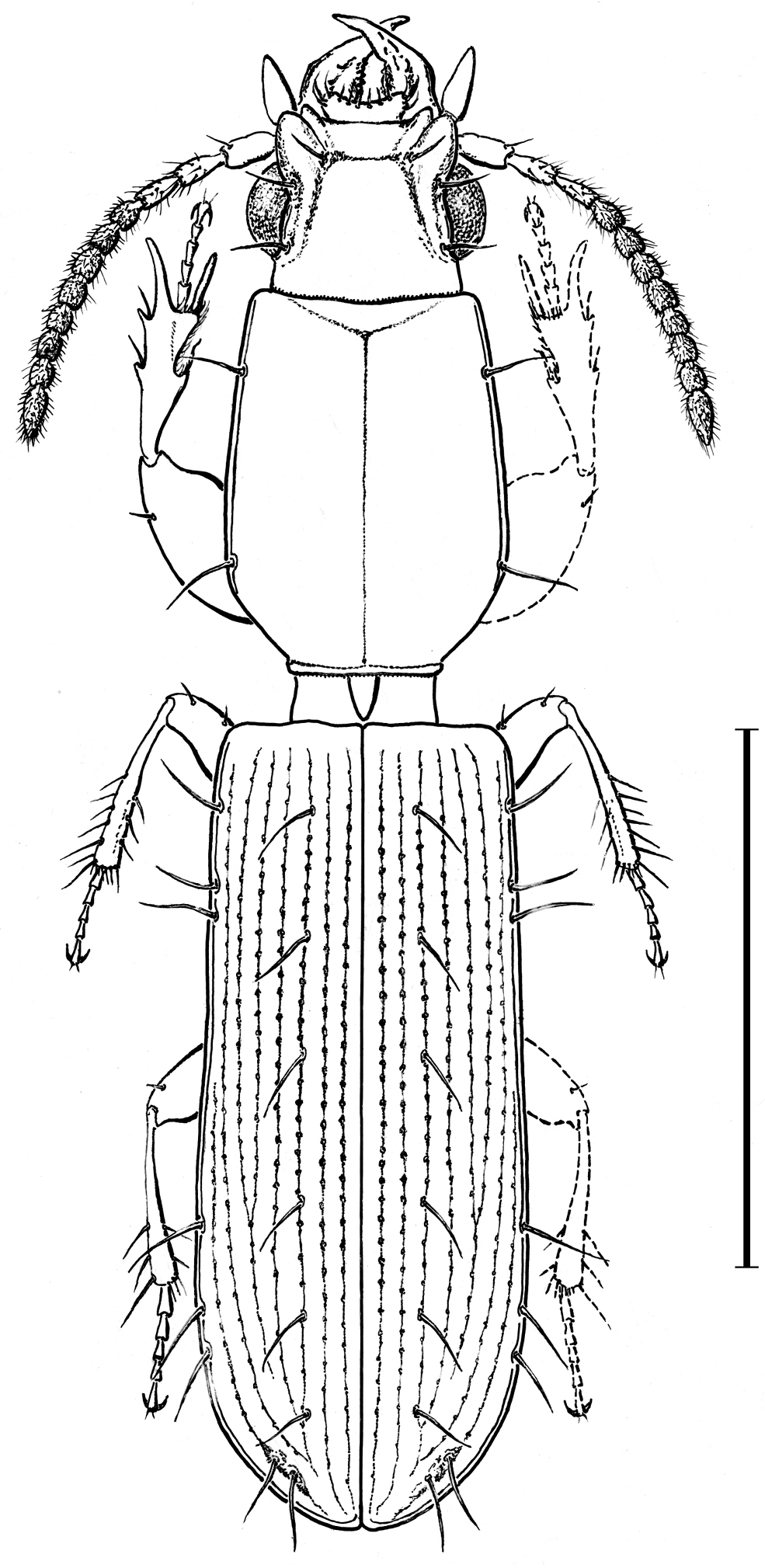

Scientific classification
- Kingdom: Animalia
- Phylum: Arthropoda
- Class: Insecta
- Order: Coleoptera
- Suborder: Adephaga
- Family: Carabidae
- Subfamily: Scaritinae
- Genus: Torretassoa; Schatzmayr & Koch, 1933
- Species: T. alfierii

Binomial name
- Torretassoa alfierii Schatzmayr & Koch, 1933

= Torretassoa =

Torretassoa alfierii

Genus of beetles

Torretassoa alfierii is a species of beetle in the family Carabidae, the only species in the genus Torretassoa. It is found in Egypt, Iraq, Saudi Arabia, Yemen, and Iran.
