= Dyscherus =

Scientific classification
- Domain: Eukaryota
- Kingdom: Animalia
- Phylum: Arthropoda
- Class: Insecta
- Order: Coleoptera
- Suborder: Adephaga
- Family: Carabidae
- Subfamily: Scaritinae
- Tribe: Scaritini
- Subtribe: Scaritina
- Genus: Dyscherus; Chaudoir, 1855

Genus of beetles

Dyscherus is a genus in the ground beetle family Carabidae. There are about 15 described species in Dyscherus, found in Madagascar.

== Species ==
These 15 species belong to the genus Dyscherus:

- Dyscherus ambondrombe Bulirsch; Janak & P.Moravec, 2005
- Dyscherus bongolavae Basilewsky, 1979
- Dyscherus costatus (Klug, 1833)
- Dyscherus descarpentriesi Basilewsky, 1976
- Dyscherus gigas Basilewsky, 1979
- Dyscherus janaki Bulirsch & P.Moravec, 2009
- Dyscherus mocquerysi Bänninger, 1934
- Dyscherus occidentalis Basilewsky, 1976
- Dyscherus pauliani Basilewsky, 1976
- Dyscherus peyrierasi Basilewsky, 1976
- Dyscherus punctatostriatus Basilewsky, 1976
- Dyscherus sicardi Jeannel, 1946
- Dyscherus storthodontoides Bänninger, 1935
- Dyscherus subgranulatus Basilewsky, 1954
- Dyscherus viettei Basilewsky, 1973
