= Orientoreicheia =

Scientific classification
- Kingdom: Animalia
- Phylum: Arthropoda
- Class: Insecta
- Order: Coleoptera
- Suborder: Adephaga
- Family: Carabidae
- Subfamily: Scaritinae
- Genus: Orientoreicheia; Bulirsch & Hůrka, 1994

Genus of beetles

Orientoreicheia is a genus of beetles in the family Carabidae, containing the following species:

- Orientoreicheia bodenheimeri Bulirsch, 1997
- Orientoreicheia caucasica (A. Fleischer, 1921)
- Orientoreicheia multisetosa Balkenohl & Brunne, 2004
