= Haplotrachelus =

Scientific classification
- Domain: Eukaryota
- Kingdom: Animalia
- Phylum: Arthropoda
- Class: Insecta
- Order: Coleoptera
- Suborder: Adephaga
- Family: Carabidae
- Subfamily: Scaritinae
- Tribe: Scaritini
- Subtribe: Scaritina
- Genus: Haplotrachelus; Chaudoir, 1855

Subgenera
- Haplotrachelinus Bänninger, 1938; Haplotrachelus Chaudoir, 1855

Synonyms
- Haplotrachelinus Bänninger, 1937; Hoplotrachelus Motschulsky, 1857; Otophthalmus Chaudoir, 1879

Genus of beetles

Haplotrachelus is a genus of carabids in the beetle family Carabidae. There are at least 20 described species in Haplotrachelus, found in Africa.

== Species ==
These 20 species belong to the genus Haplotrachelus:

- Haplotrachelus atropis (Bates, 1875) (Mozambique, South Africa)
- Haplotrachelus capicola (Dejean, 1831) (South Africa)
- Haplotrachelus dregei Chaudoir, 1879 (South Africa)
- Haplotrachelus holcopleurus Chaudoir, 1855 (Zimbabwe, Botswana, South Africa)
- Haplotrachelus ignobilis Chaudoir, 1879 (South Africa)
- Haplotrachelus laevis Bänninger, 1932 (South Africa)
- Haplotrachelus latesulcatus (Bates, 1875) (South Africa)
- Haplotrachelus lissotonus Basilewsky , 1958 (South Africa)
- Haplotrachelus meracus Péringuey, 1898 (South Africa)
- Haplotrachelus ovipennis (Chaudoir, 1843) (South Africa)
- Haplotrachelus oviventris Chaudoir, 1879 (South Africa)
- Haplotrachelus pasimachoides Chaudoir, 1879 (South Africa)
- Haplotrachelus patruelis Chaudoir, 1855 (South Africa)
- Haplotrachelus planatus Bänninger, 1935 (South Africa)
- Haplotrachelus polypleurus (Bates, 1875) (South Africa)
- Haplotrachelus pondoanus Bänninger, 1935 (South Africa)
- Haplotrachelus punctuliger (Bates, 1875) (South Africa)
- Haplotrachelus subcrenatus Chaudoir, 1855 (South Africa)
- Haplotrachelus transvaalensis Chaudoir, 1879 (Zimbabwe, South Africa)
- Haplotrachelus wiedemanni (Crotch, 1871) (South Africa)
