= Storthodontus =

Scientific classification
- Domain: Eukaryota
- Kingdom: Animalia
- Phylum: Arthropoda
- Class: Insecta
- Order: Coleoptera
- Suborder: Adephaga
- Family: Carabidae
- Subfamily: Scaritinae
- Tribe: Scaritini
- Subtribe: Scaritina
- Genus: Storthodontus; Chaudoir, 1855

Genus of beetles

Storthodontus is a genus in the ground beetle family Carabidae. There are about 11 described species in Storthodontus, found in Madagascar.

== Species ==
These 11 species belong to the genus Storthodontus:

- Storthodontus aegeon Chaudoir, 1862
- Storthodontus ambreanus Boileau, 1902
- Storthodontus boileaui Alluaud, 1930
- Storthodontus bresseti Boileau, 1902
- Storthodontus diastictus Alluaud, 1930
- Storthodontus elegans Jeannel, 1946
- Storthodontus impressifrons (Fairmaire, 1898)
- Storthodontus mathiauxi Jeannel, 1946
- Storthodontus nimrod Chaudoir, 1855
- Storthodontus peyrierasi Basilewsky, 1973
- Storthodontus reticulatus Basilewsky, 1957
