= Paracoryza =

Scientific classification
- Kingdom: Animalia
- Phylum: Arthropoda
- Class: Insecta
- Order: Coleoptera
- Suborder: Adephaga
- Family: Carabidae
- Subfamily: Scaritinae
- Genus: Paracoryza; Basilewsky, 1952

Genus of beetles

Paracoryza is a genus of beetles in the family Carabidae, containing the following species:

- Paracoryza canaliculata Balkenohl, 2000
- Paracoryza incribra Balkenohl & Schüle, 2005
- Paracoryza insulana Basilewsky, 1973
- Paracoryza mahnerti Balkenohl, 2000
- Paracoryza parvusulcata Balkenohl & Schüle, 2005
- Paracoryza taitensis Balkenohl & Schüle, 2005
