= Obadius =

Scientific classification
- Kingdom: Animalia
- Phylum: Arthropoda
- Class: Insecta
- Order: Coleoptera
- Suborder: Adephaga
- Family: Carabidae
- Subfamily: Scaritinae
- Tribe: Clivinini
- Subtribe: Forcipatorina
- Genus: Obadius; Burmeister, 1875

Genus of beetles

Obadius is a genus in the ground beetle family Carabidae. There are at least two described species in Obadius, found in Uruguay.

== Species ==
These two species belong to the genus Obadius:

- Obadius affinis Tremoleras, 1931
- Obadius insignis Burmeister, 1875
