= Setodyschirius =

Scientific classification
- Domain: Eukaryota
- Kingdom: Animalia
- Phylum: Arthropoda
- Class: Insecta
- Order: Coleoptera
- Suborder: Adephaga
- Family: Carabidae
- Subfamily: Scaritinae
- Tribe: Dyschiriini
- Genus: Setodyschirius; Fedorenko, 1996

Genus of beetles

Setodyschirius is a genus in the ground beetle family Carabidae. There are about 13 described species in Setodyschirius, found in Australia.

== Species ==
These 13 species belong to the genus Setodyschirius:

- Setodyschirius jabiru Bulirsch, 2011
- Setodyschirius kangaroo Bulirsch, 2011
- Setodyschirius macleayi (Sloane, 1896)
- Setodyschirius mastersii (W. J. Macleay, 1866)
- Setodyschirius monteithianus Bulirsch, 2011
- Setodyschirius ovensensis (Blackburn, 1891)
- Setodyschirius pseudozonatus Bulirsch, 2011
- Setodyschirius stephensii (W. J. Macleay, 1865)
- Setodyschirius storeyi Bulirsch, 2011
- Setodyschirius torrensensis (Blackburn, 1890)
- Setodyschirius weiri Bulirsch, 2011
- Setodyschirius wilsoni (Sloane, 1923)
- Setodyschirius zonatus (Putzeys, 1868)
