= Thlibops =

Scientific classification
- Kingdom: Animalia
- Phylum: Arthropoda
- Class: Insecta
- Order: Coleoptera
- Suborder: Adephaga
- Family: Carabidae
- Subfamily: Scaritinae
- Genus: Thlibops; Putzeys, 1866

Genus of beetles

Thlibops is a genus of beetles in the family Carabidae, containing the following species. They are found in Africa.

- Thlibops congoensis Basilewsky, 1958
- Thlibops longicollis (Putzeys, 1846)
