= Iberodytes =

Iberodytes ramiroi

Scientific classification
- Kingdom: Animalia
- Phylum: Arthropoda
- Class: Insecta
- Order: Coleoptera
- Suborder: Adephaga
- Family: Carabidae
- Subfamily: Scaritinae
- Genus: Iberodytes; Jeannel, 1949
- Species: I. ramiroi

Binomial name
- Iberodytes ramiroi Jeannel, 1949

Genus of beetles

Iberodytes ramiroi is a species of beetle in the family Carabidae, the only species in the genus Iberodytes.
