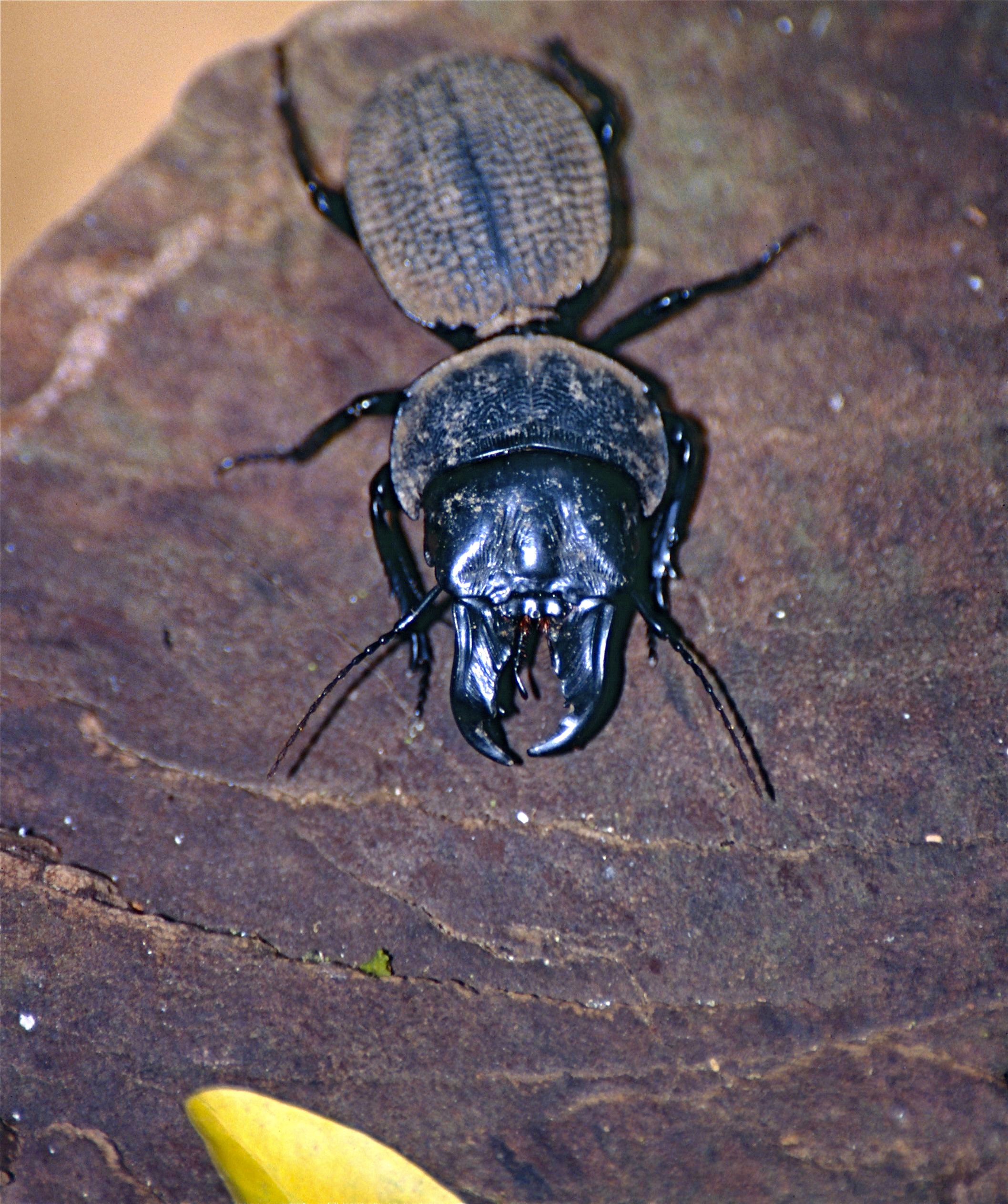
- Dinoscaris, Madagascar

Scientific classification
- Domain: Eukaryota
- Kingdom: Animalia
- Phylum: Arthropoda
- Class: Insecta
- Order: Coleoptera
- Suborder: Adephaga
- Family: Carabidae
- Subfamily: Scaritinae
- Tribe: Scaritini
- Subtribe: Scaritina
- Genus: Dinoscaris; Alluaud, 1902

= Dinoscaris =

Genus of beetles

Dinoscaris is a genus in the ground beetle family Carabidae. There are about seven described species in Dinoscaris, found in Madagascar.

== Species ==
These seven species belong to the genus Dinoscaris:

- Dinoscaris atrox (Bänninger, 1934)
- Dinoscaris cribripennis (Chaudoir, 1843)
- Dinoscaris detriei (Alluaud, 1902)
- Dinoscaris gallienii (Alluaud, 1902)
- Dinoscaris rostrata (Fairmaire, 1905)
- Dinoscaris sicardi (Jeannel, 1946)
- Dinoscaris venator (Chaudoir, 1855)
