= Kultianella =

Scientific classification
- Domain: Eukaryota
- Kingdom: Animalia
- Phylum: Arthropoda
- Class: Insecta
- Order: Coleoptera
- Suborder: Adephaga
- Family: Carabidae
- Subfamily: Scaritinae
- Tribe: Clivinini
- Subtribe: Forcipatorina
- Genus: Kultianella; Perrault, 1994

Genus of beetles

Kultianella is a genus in the ground beetle family Carabidae. There are at least two described species in Kultianella, found in Brazil.

== Species ==
These two species belong to the genus Kultianella:

- Kultianella sulcicollis (Putzeys, 1867)
- Kultianella sulculata (Putzeys, 1867)
