= Tonkinoscaris =

Tonkinoscaris excisicollis

Scientific classification
- Kingdom: Animalia
- Phylum: Arthropoda
- Class: Insecta
- Order: Coleoptera
- Suborder: Adephaga
- Family: Carabidae
- Subfamily: Scaritinae
- Genus: Tonkinoscaris; Banninger, 1956
- Species: T. excisicollis

Binomial name
- Tonkinoscaris excisicollis Banninger, 1956

Genus of beetles

Tonkinoscaris excisicollis is a species of beetle in the family Carabidae, the only species in the genus Tonkinoscaris. It is found in China and Vietnam.
