= Scapterus =

Scientific classification
- Kingdom: Animalia
- Phylum: Arthropoda
- Class: Insecta
- Order: Coleoptera
- Suborder: Adephaga
- Family: Carabidae
- Subfamily: Scaritinae
- Tribe: Scaritini
- Subtribe: Scapterina
- Genus: Scapterus; Dejean, 1826

Genus of beetles

Scapterus is a genus in the ground beetle family Carabidae. There are about five described species in Scapterus.

== Species ==
These five species belong to the genus Scapterus:

- Scapterus crenatus (Fabricius, 1792) (India, Vietnam)
- Scapterus guerini Dejean, 1826 (India, Myanmar)
- Scapterus riparius Gestro, 1883 (India, Myanmar)
- Scapterus stevensi Andrewes, 1929 (India)
- Scapterus sulcatus Putzeys, 1861 (India, Myanmar)
