= Thliboclivina =

Scientific classification
- Domain: Eukaryota
- Kingdom: Animalia
- Phylum: Arthropoda
- Class: Insecta
- Order: Coleoptera
- Suborder: Adephaga
- Family: Carabidae
- Subfamily: Scaritinae
- Tribe: Clivinini
- Subtribe: Clivinina
- Genus: Thliboclivina; Kult, 1959

Genus of beetles

Thliboclivina is a genus of in the beetle family Carabidae. There are at least four described species in Thliboclivina.

== Species ==
These four species belong to the genus Thliboclivina:

- Thliboclivina amalita Basilewsky, 1964 (Senegal/Gambia and Ivory Coast)
- Thliboclivina bartolozzii Balkenohl, 2001 (India)
- Thliboclivina diophthalmica (Basilewsky, 1955) (Angola)
- Thliboclivina microphthalma (Burgeon, 1937) (Democratic Republic of the Congo)
