= Dyscherinus =

Scientific classification
- Domain: Eukaryota
- Kingdom: Animalia
- Phylum: Arthropoda
- Class: Insecta
- Order: Coleoptera
- Suborder: Adephaga
- Family: Carabidae
- Subfamily: Scaritinae
- Tribe: Scaritini
- Subtribe: Scaritina
- Genus: Dyscherinus; Jeannel, 1955

Genus of beetles

Dyscherinus is a genus in the ground beetle family Carabidae. There are at least three described species in Dyscherinus, found in Madagascar.

== Species ==
These three species belong to the genus Dyscherinus:

- Dyscherinus pauliani Jeannel, 1955
- Dyscherinus pseudomodus (Bänninger, 1933)
- Dyscherinus vadoni Basilewsky, 1973
