= Haplogaster =

Scientific classification
- Domain: Eukaryota
- Kingdom: Animalia
- Phylum: Arthropoda
- Class: Insecta
- Order: Coleoptera
- Suborder: Adephaga
- Family: Carabidae
- Subfamily: Scaritinae
- Tribe: Scaritini
- Subtribe: Scaritina
- Genus: Haplogaster; Chaudoir, 1879

Genus of beetles

Haplogaster is a genus of carabids in the beetle family Carabidae. There are about nine described species in Haplogaster, found in south and central Asia.

== Species ==
These nine species belong to the genus Haplogaster:

- Haplogaster ampliata Bates, 1892 (Myanmar)
- Haplogaster elongata Bänninger, 1932 (India)
- Haplogaster granulipennis Balkenohl, 1994 (Bhutan)
- Haplogaster himalayica Bänninger, 1935 (India)
- Haplogaster manipurensis Bänninger, 1932 (India)
- Haplogaster mollita Bates, 1892 (Myanmar)
- Haplogaster ovata Chaudoir, 1879 (Nepal, Bhutan, Bangladesh, India)
- Haplogaster rugosa Landin, 1955 (China, Myanmar)
- Haplogaster wardi Andrewes, 1929 (China, Myanmar)
