= Forcipator =

Scientific classification
- Domain: Eukaryota
- Kingdom: Animalia
- Phylum: Arthropoda
- Class: Insecta
- Order: Coleoptera
- Suborder: Adephaga
- Family: Carabidae
- Subfamily: Scaritinae
- Tribe: Clivinini
- Subtribe: Forcipatorina
- Genus: Forcipator; Maindron, 1904

Synonyms
- Oxystomus Dejean, 1825

Genus of beetles

Forcipator is a genus in the ground beetle family Carabidae. There are at least four described species in Forcipator, found in South America.

== Species ==
These four species belong to the genus Forcipator:

- Forcipator cylindricus (Dejean, 1825) (Brazil)
- Forcipator grandis (Perty, 1830) (Brazil)
- Forcipator putzeysii (Chaudoir, 1868) (Colombia)
- Forcipator sanctihilarii (Latreille, 1829) (Brazil)
