= Cameroniola =

Scientific classification
- Domain: Eukaryota
- Kingdom: Animalia
- Phylum: Arthropoda
- Class: Insecta
- Order: Coleoptera
- Suborder: Adephaga
- Family: Carabidae
- Tribe: Clivinini
- Subtribe: Clivinina
- Genus: Cameroniola; Baehr, 1999
- Species: C. kryzhanovskiji

Binomial name
- Cameroniola kryzhanovskiji Baehr, 1999

Genus of beetles

Cameroniola kryzhanovskiji is a species of beetle in the family Carabidae, the only species in the genus Cameroniola.
