= Epilectus =

Scientific classification
- Domain: Eukaryota
- Kingdom: Animalia
- Phylum: Arthropoda
- Class: Insecta
- Order: Coleoptera
- Suborder: Adephaga
- Family: Carabidae
- Subtribe: Carenina
- Genus: Epilectus; Blackburn, 1888

Synonyms
- Carenarchus Sloane, 1905; Eurygnathus Blackburn, 1888

Genus of beetles

Epilectus is a genus in the ground beetle family Carabidae. There are two described species in Epilectus, found in Australia.

The genus Epilectus Faust, 1904, a weevil, is a synonym of Eurycleonus Bedel, 1907 and is no longer valid.

== Species ==
These five species belong to the genus Epilectus:

- Epilectus fortis (Blackburn, 1888)
- Epilectus mastersi (W.J.MacLeay, 1869)
