= Catalanodytes =

Scientific classification
- Domain: Eukaryota
- Kingdom: Animalia
- Phylum: Arthropoda
- Class: Insecta
- Order: Coleoptera
- Suborder: Adephaga
- Family: Carabidae
- Tribe: Clivinini
- Subtribe: Reicheiina
- Genus: Catalanodytes; Sciaky, 1989
- Species: C. bellesi

Binomial name
- Catalanodytes bellesi (Lagar Mascaro, 1971)

Genus of beetles

Catalanodytes is a genus in the ground beetle family Carabidae. This genus has a single species, Catalanodytes bellesi. It is found in Spain.
