= Spelaeodytes =

Scientific classification
- Domain: Eukaryota
- Kingdom: Animalia
- Phylum: Arthropoda
- Class: Insecta
- Order: Coleoptera
- Suborder: Adephaga
- Family: Carabidae
- Tribe: Clivinini
- Subtribe: Reicheiina
- Genus: Spelaeodytes; L.Miller, 1863
- Species: S. mirabilis

Binomial name
- Spelaeodytes mirabilis L.Miller, 1863

Synonyms
- Spelaeodites Reiche, 1872

Genus of beetles

Spelaeodytes is a genus in the ground beetle family Carabidae. This genus has a single species, Spelaeodytes mirabilis. It is found in Bosnia and Herzegovina.
