= Holoprizus =

Scientific classification
- Domain: Eukaryota
- Kingdom: Animalia
- Phylum: Arthropoda
- Class: Insecta
- Order: Coleoptera
- Suborder: Adephaga
- Family: Carabidae
- Tribe: Salcediini
- Subtribe: Solenogenyina
- Genus: Holoprizus; Putzeys, 1867
- Species: H. serratus

Binomial name
- Holoprizus serratus Putzeys, 1867

Genus of beetles

Holoprizus is a genus in the beetle family Carabidae. This genus has a single species, Holoprizus serratus. It is found in Brazil.
