= Oxygnathopsis =

Scientific classification
- Domain: Eukaryota
- Kingdom: Animalia
- Phylum: Arthropoda
- Class: Insecta
- Order: Coleoptera
- Suborder: Adephaga
- Family: Carabidae
- Tribe: Clivinini
- Subtribe: Forcipatorina
- Genus: Oxygnathopsis; Louwerens, 1953
- Species: O. javana

Binomial name
- Oxygnathopsis javana (Andrewes, 1938)

Genus of beetles

Oxygnathopsis is a genus in the ground beetle family Carabidae. This genus has a single species, Oxygnathopsis javana. It is found in Indonesia.
