= Clivinopsis =

Scientific classification
- Kingdom: Animalia
- Phylum: Arthropoda
- Class: Insecta
- Order: Coleoptera
- Suborder: Adephaga
- Family: Carabidae
- Tribe: Dyschiriini
- Genus: Clivinopsis; Bedel, 1895
- Species: C. strigifrons

Binomial name
- Clivinopsis strigifrons (Fairmaire, 1874)

Genus of beetles

Clivinopsis is a genus of ground beetles in the family Carabidae. This genus has a single species, Clivinopsis strigifrons, found in North Africa.

Two former species of this genus, Clivinopsis bonifacei and Clivinopsis conicicollis, were determined to be synonyms of the sole valid species, Clivinopsis strigifrons.
