= Neochryopus =

Scientific classification
- Domain: Eukaryota
- Kingdom: Animalia
- Phylum: Arthropoda
- Class: Insecta
- Order: Coleoptera
- Suborder: Adephaga
- Family: Carabidae
- Tribe: Scaritini
- Subtribe: Scaritina
- Genus: Neochryopus; Bänninger, 1932
- Species: N. savagei

Binomial name
- Neochryopus savagei (Hope, 1842)

Synonyms
- Ochryopus Chaudoir, 1855

Genus of beetles

Neochryopus is a genus in the ground beetle family Carabidae. This genus has a single species, Neochryopus savagei, found in Africa.
