= Reicheidius =

Scientific classification
- Kingdom: Animalia
- Phylum: Arthropoda
- Class: Insecta
- Order: Coleoptera
- Suborder: Adephaga
- Family: Carabidae
- Tribe: Clivinini
- Subtribe: Reicheiina
- Genus: Reicheidius; Jeannel, 1957
- Species: R. frondicola

Binomial name
- Reicheidius frondicola (Reitter, 1881)

Genus of beetles

Reicheidius is a genus in the ground beetle family Carabidae. This genus has a single species, Reicheidius frondicola. It is found in Croatia, Bosnia-Herzegovina, and (former) Yugoslavia.
