= Camptidius =

Scientific classification
- Domain: Eukaryota
- Kingdom: Animalia
- Phylum: Arthropoda
- Class: Insecta
- Order: Coleoptera
- Suborder: Adephaga
- Family: Carabidae
- Tribe: Clivinini
- Subtribe: Forcipatorina
- Genus: Camptidius; Putzeys, 1866
- Species: C. ophthalmicus

Binomial name
- Camptidius ophthalmicus Putzeys, 1866

Genus of beetles

Camptidius ophthalmicus is a species of beetle in the family Carabidae, the only species in the genus Camptidius. It is found in Brazil.
