= Macromorphus =

Scientific classification
- Domain: Eukaryota
- Kingdom: Animalia
- Phylum: Arthropoda
- Class: Insecta
- Order: Coleoptera
- Suborder: Adephaga
- Family: Carabidae
- Tribe: Scaritini
- Subtribe: Scaritina
- Genus: Macromorphus; Chaudoir, 1857
- Species: M. boisduvali

Binomial name
- Macromorphus boisduvali Bänninger, 1939

Genus of beetles

Macromorphus is a genus in the ground beetle family Carabidae. This genus has a single species, Macromorphus boisduvali. It is found in South Africa.
