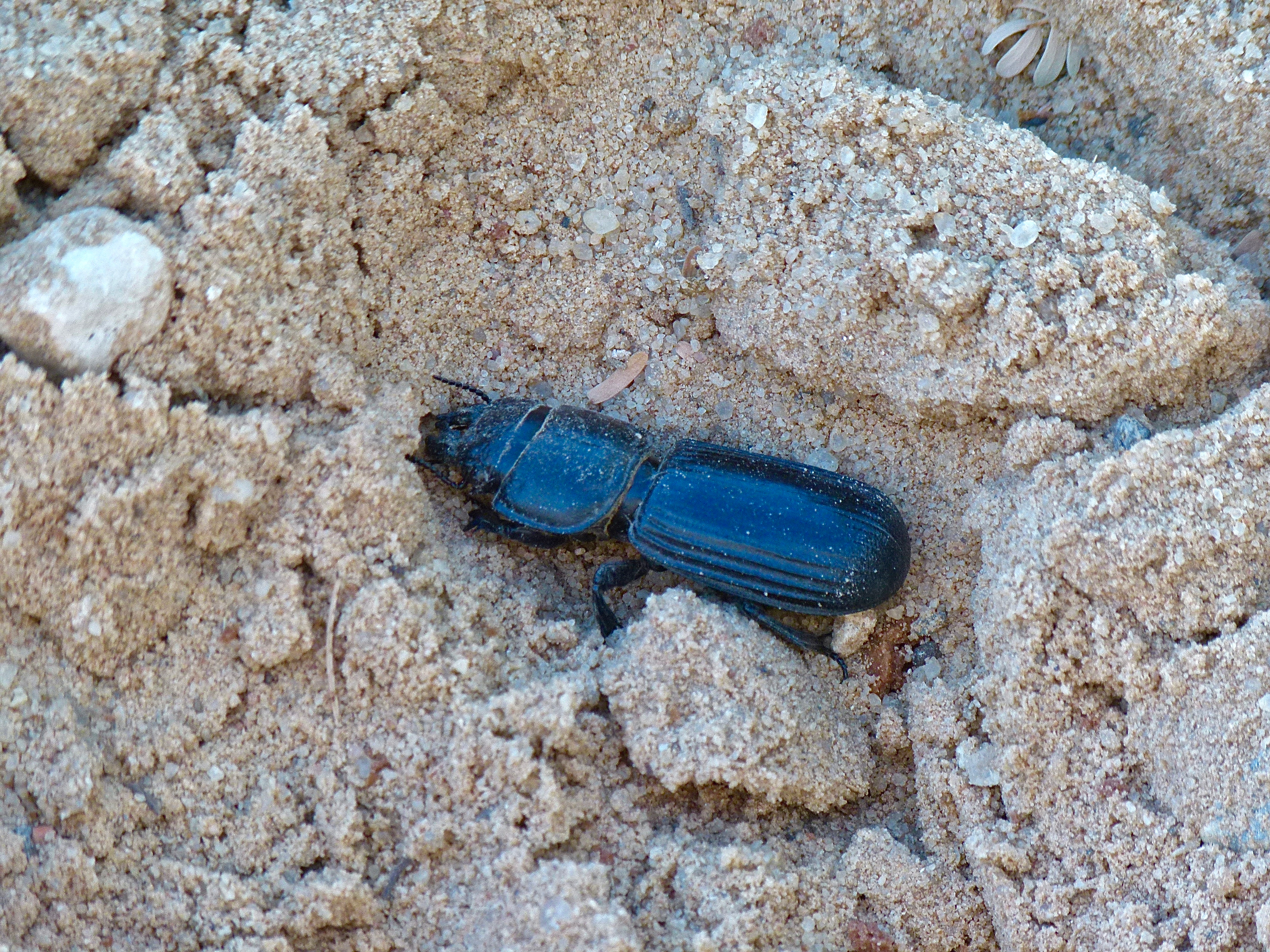
- Burrowing in Kalahari sand, South Africa

Scientific classification
- Kingdom: Animalia
- Phylum: Arthropoda
- Class: Insecta
- Order: Coleoptera
- Suborder: Adephaga
- Family: Carabidae
- Tribe: Scaritini
- Subtribe: Scapterina
- Genus: Passalidius; Chaudoir, 1863
- Species: P. fortipes

Binomial name
- Passalidius fortipes (Boheman, 1860)

= Passalidius =

Burrowing ground beetle

Genus of beetles

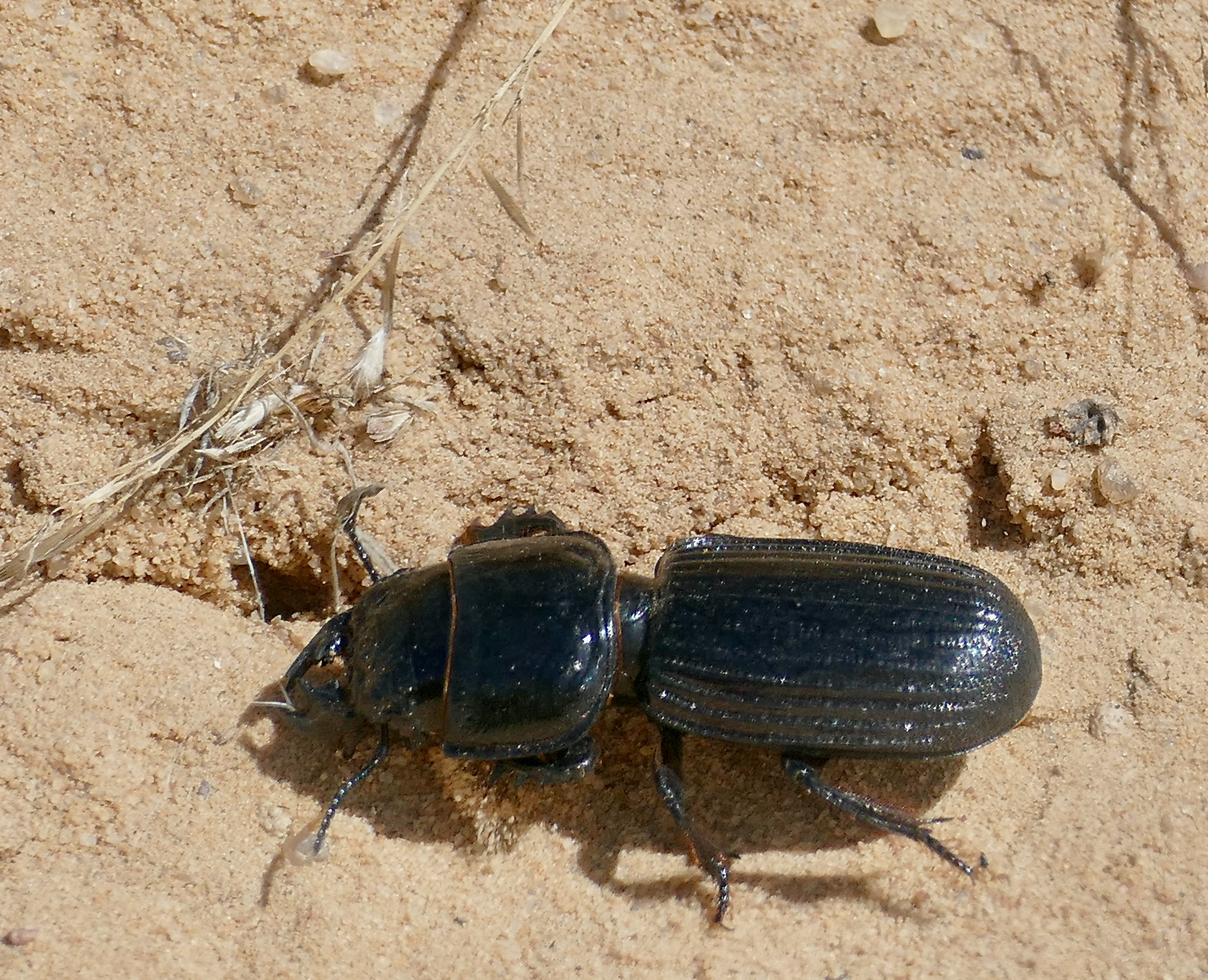
In the Nossob riverbed, Kgalagadi Transfrontier Park, South Africa

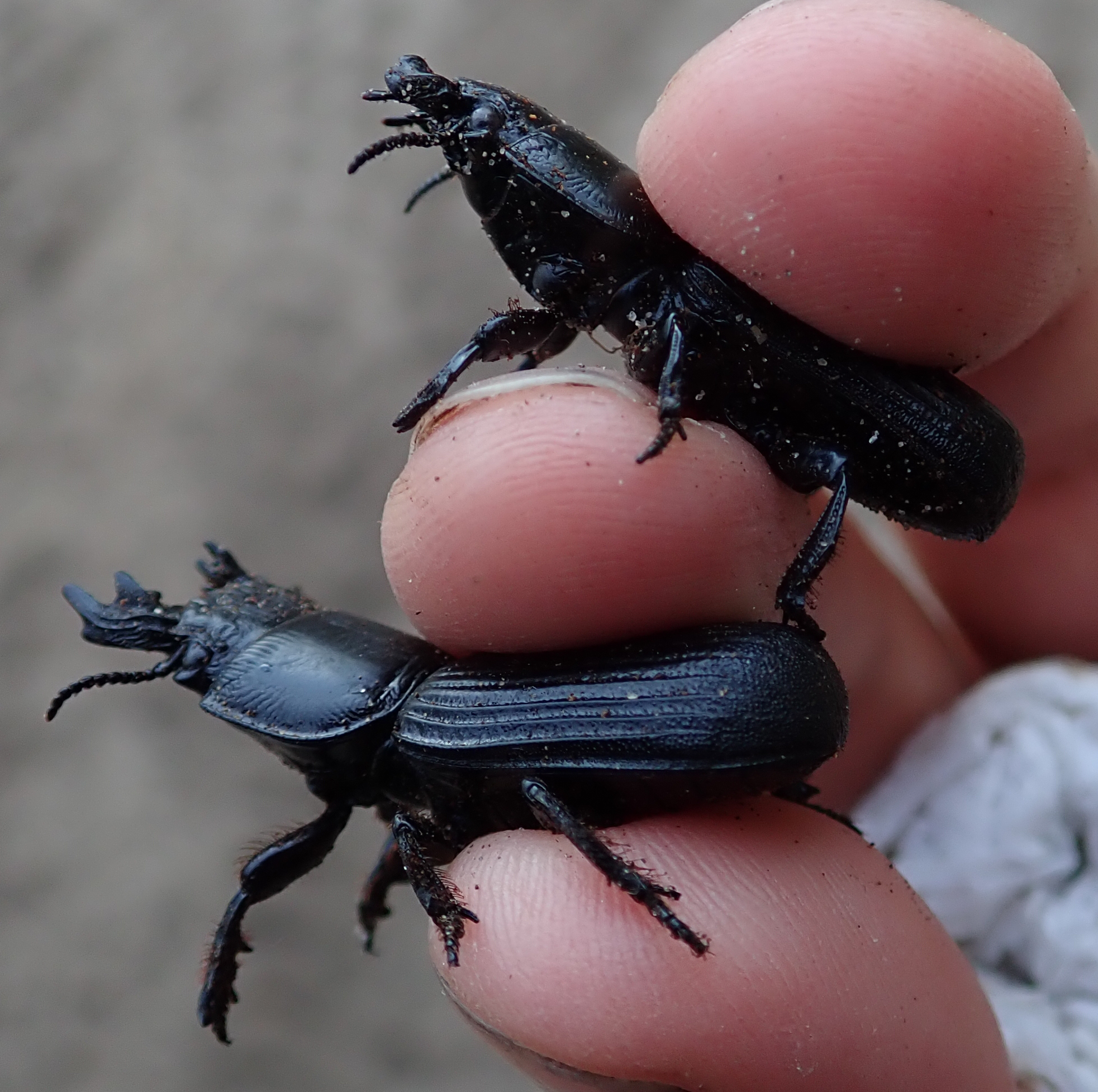
Passalidius fortipes, Botswana

Passalidius is a genus in the ground beetle family Carabidae. This genus has a single species, Passalidius fortipes. It is found in Namibia, Botswana, and South Africa.
