= Kenyoreicheia =

Scientific classification
- Domain: Eukaryota
- Kingdom: Animalia
- Phylum: Arthropoda
- Class: Insecta
- Order: Coleoptera
- Suborder: Adephaga
- Family: Carabidae
- Tribe: Clivinini
- Subtribe: Reicheiina
- Genus: Kenyoreicheia; Bulirsch & Magrini, 2007
- Species: K. aberdarensis

Binomial name
- Kenyoreicheia aberdarensis Bulirsch & Magrini, 2007

Genus of beetles

Kenyoreicheia is a genus in the ground beetle family Carabidae. This genus has a single species, Kenyoreicheia aberdarensis. It is found in Kenya.
