= Sinesetosa =

Scientific classification
- Kingdom: Animalia
- Phylum: Arthropoda
- Class: Insecta
- Order: Coleoptera
- Suborder: Adephaga
- Family: Carabidae
- Tribe: Clivinini
- Subtribe: Clivinina
- Genus: Sinesetosa; Balkenohl, 1996
- Species: S. acugena

Binomial name
- Sinesetosa acugena Balkenohl, 1996

Genus of beetles

Sinesetosa is a genus in the ground beetle family Carabidae. This genus has a single species, Sinesetosa acugena. It is found in Thailand and Vietnam.
