= Neoscaphus =

Scientific classification
- Kingdom: Animalia
- Phylum: Arthropoda
- Class: Insecta
- Order: Coleoptera
- Suborder: Adephaga
- Family: Carabidae
- Tribe: Scaritini
- Subtribe: Carenina
- Genus: Neoscaphus; Sloane, 1888
- Species: N. simplex

Binomial name
- Neoscaphus simplex Sloane, 1888

Genus of beetles

Neoscaphus is a genus in the ground beetle family Carabidae. This genus has a single species, Neoscaphus simplex. It is found in Australia.
