= Platysphyrus =

Scientific classification
- Kingdom: Animalia
- Phylum: Arthropoda
- Class: Insecta
- Order: Coleoptera
- Suborder: Adephaga
- Family: Carabidae
- Tribe: Clivinini
- Subtribe: Clivinina
- Genus: Platysphyrus; Sloane, 1905
- Species: P. tibialis

Binomial name
- Platysphyrus tibialis Sloane, 1905

Genus of beetles

Platysphyrus is a genus in the ground beetle family Carabidae. This genus has a single species, Platysphyrus tibialis. It is found in Australia.
