= Neodyschirius =

Scientific classification
- Kingdom: Animalia
- Phylum: Arthropoda
- Class: Insecta
- Order: Coleoptera
- Suborder: Adephaga
- Family: Carabidae
- Tribe: Dyschiriini
- Genus: Neodyschirius; Kult, 1954
- Species: N. cruciatus

Binomial name
- Neodyschirius cruciatus (Burgeon, 1935)

Genus of beetles

Neodyschirius is a genus in the ground beetle family Carabidae. This genus has a single species, Neodyschirius cruciatus. It is found in the Democratic Republic of the Congo.
