= Clivina lata =

Scientific classification
- Domain: Eukaryota
- Kingdom: Animalia
- Phylum: Arthropoda
- Class: Insecta
- Order: Coleoptera
- Suborder: Adephaga
- Family: Carabidae
- Subfamily: Scaritinae
- Tribe: Clivinini
- Subtribe: Clivinina
- Genus: Clivina
- Species: C. lata

Binomial name
- Clivina lata Putzeys, 1867

Synonyms
- Clivina khasi Jedlička, 1964

Species of beetle

Clivina lata is a species of ground beetle in the family Carabidae, found in Indomalaya. The species Clivina khasi is now considered to be a taxonomic synonym of Clivina lata.
