= Clivina lebasii =

Scientific classification
- Domain: Eukaryota
- Kingdom: Animalia
- Phylum: Arthropoda
- Class: Insecta
- Order: Coleoptera
- Suborder: Adephaga
- Family: Carabidae
- Subfamily: Scaritinae
- Tribe: Clivinini
- Subtribe: Clivinina
- Genus: Clivina
- Species: C. lebasii

Binomial name
- Clivina lebasii Putzeys, 1846

Synonyms
- Clivina lebasi

Species of beetle

Clivina lebasii is a species in the beetle family Carabidae. It is found in Colombia.
