= Clivina amazonica =

Scientific classification
- Kingdom: Animalia
- Phylum: Arthropoda
- Class: Insecta
- Order: Coleoptera
- Suborder: Adephaga
- Family: Carabidae
- Genus: Clivina
- Species: C. amazonica

Binomial name
- Clivina amazonica Putzeys, 1861

Species of beetle

Clivina amazonica is a species of ground beetle belonging to the subfamily Scaritinae. It was described by Jules Putzeys in 1861.
