= Pyramoides oblongicollis =

Scientific classification
- Domain: Eukaryota
- Kingdom: Animalia
- Phylum: Arthropoda
- Class: Insecta
- Order: Coleoptera
- Suborder: Adephaga
- Family: Carabidae
- Subfamily: Scaritinae
- Tribe: Clivinini
- Subtribe: Clivinina
- Genus: Pyramoides
- Species: P. oblongicollis

Binomial name
- Pyramoides oblongicollis (Putzeys, 1863)

Synonyms
- Clivina oblongicollis Putzeys, 1863

Species of beetle

Pyramoides oblongicollis is a species of ground beetle in the family Carabidae, found in Brazil.
