= Clivina bovillae =

Scientific classification
- Domain: Eukaryota
- Kingdom: Animalia
- Phylum: Arthropoda
- Class: Insecta
- Order: Coleoptera
- Suborder: Adephaga
- Family: Carabidae
- Subfamily: Scaritinae
- Tribe: Clivinini
- Subtribe: Clivinina
- Genus: Clivina
- Species: C. bovillae

Binomial name
- Clivina bovillae Blackburn, 1890

Synonyms
- Clivina tumidifrons Baehr, 1989

Species of beetle

Clivina bovillae is a species of ground beetle in the subfamily Scaritinae, native to Australia. It was described by Blackburn in 1890.
