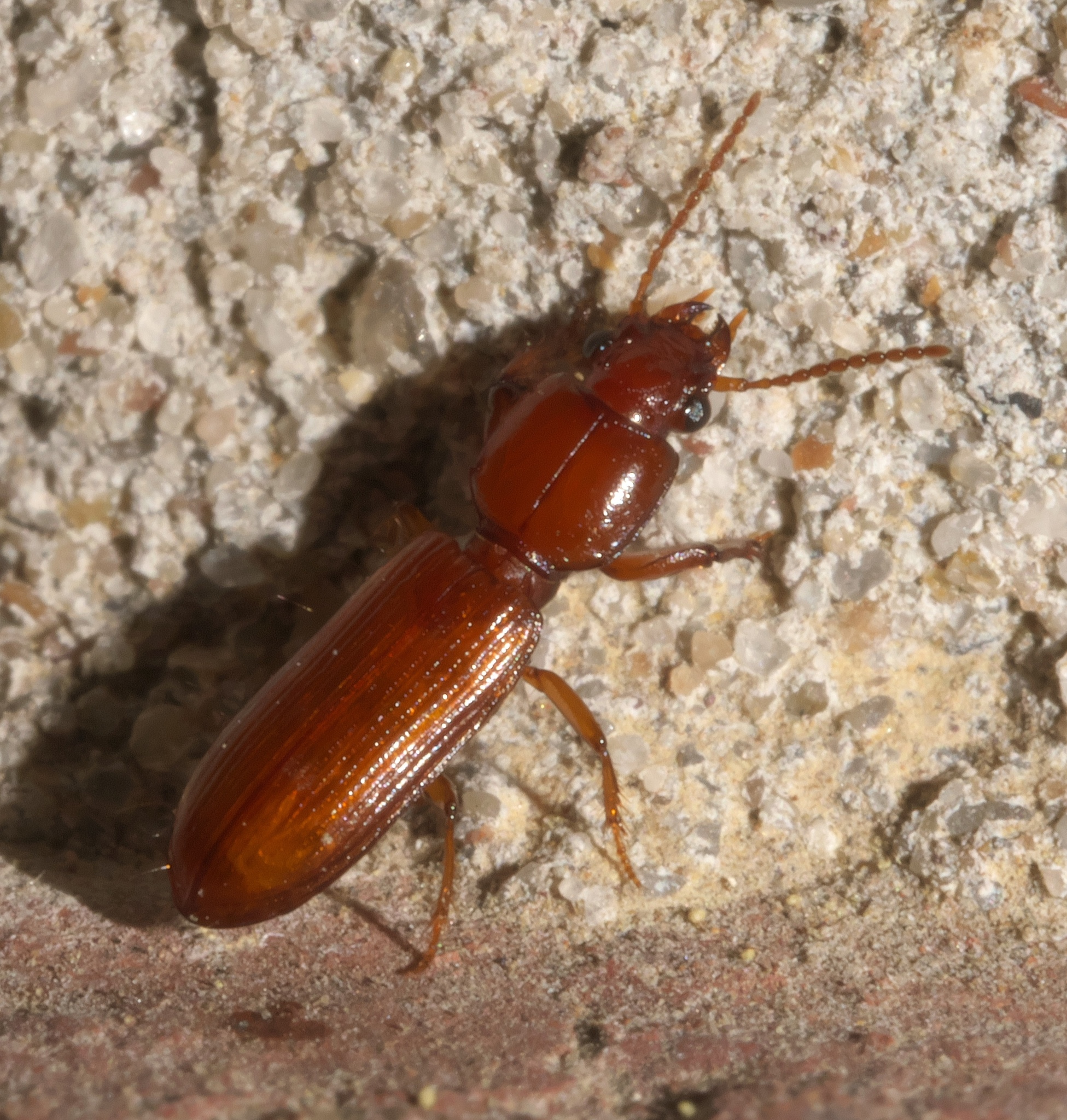
- Clivina planicollis, Oklahoma

Scientific classification
- Domain: Eukaryota
- Kingdom: Animalia
- Phylum: Arthropoda
- Class: Insecta
- Order: Coleoptera
- Suborder: Adephaga
- Family: Carabidae
- Subfamily: Scaritinae
- Tribe: Clivinini
- Subtribe: Clivinina
- Genus: Clivina
- Species: C. planicollis

Binomial name
- Clivina planicollis LeConte, 1857

Synonyms
- Clivina texana LeConte, 1863

= Clivina planicollis =

Species of beetle

Clivina planicollis is a species of ground beetle in the subfamily Scaritinae. It is found in Central America, Mexico, and the United States. It was described by John Lawrence LeConte in 1857.
