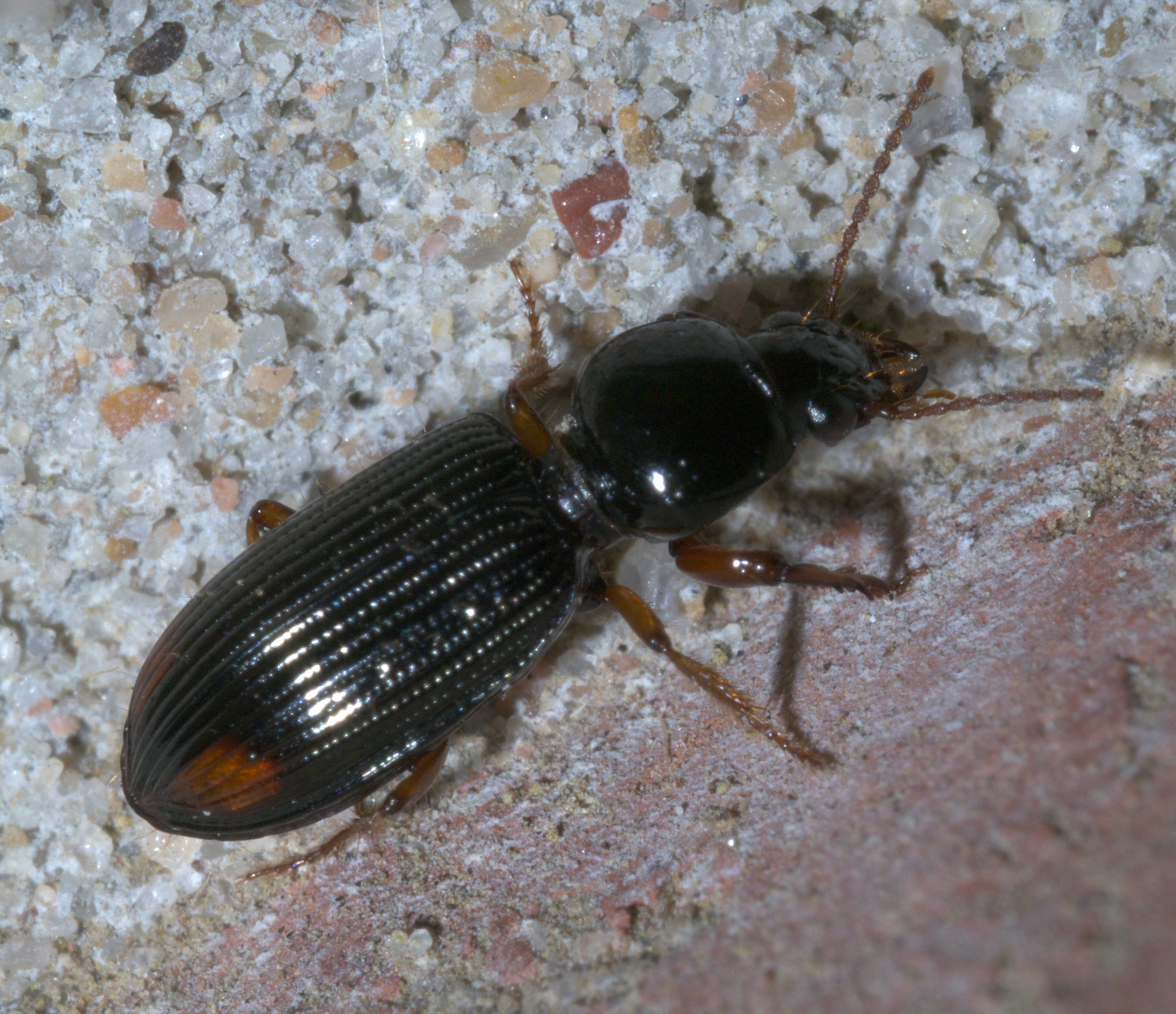
- Aspidoglossa subangulata

Scientific classification
- Domain: Eukaryota
- Kingdom: Animalia
- Phylum: Arthropoda
- Class: Insecta
- Order: Coleoptera
- Suborder: Adephaga
- Family: Carabidae
- Subfamily: Scaritinae
- Tribe: Clivinini
- Genus: Aspidoglossa; Putzeys, 1846

= Aspidoglossa =

Genus of beetles

Aspidoglossa is a genus of beetles in the family Carabidae. It is found primarily in the Neotropics with one species, Aspidoglossa subangulata, in the United States.

Aspidoglossa contains the following species:

- Aspidoglossa aerata Putzeys, 1846
- Aspidoglossa agnata Putzeys, 1866
- Aspidoglossa brachydera H. W. Bates, 1878
- Aspidoglossa crenata (Dejean, 1825)
- Aspidoglossa cribrata Putzeys, 1846
- Aspidoglossa curta Putzeys, 1866
- Aspidoglossa distincta Putzeys, 1866
- Aspidoglossa intermedia (Dejean, 1831)
- Aspidoglossa korschefskyi Kult, 1950
- Aspidoglossa latiuscula Putzeys, 1866
- Aspidoglossa mexicana (Chaudoir, 1837)
- Aspidoglossa minor Kult, 1950
- Aspidoglossa obenbergeri Kult, 1950
- Aspidoglossa ogloblini Kult, 1950
- Aspidoglossa pallida Putzeys, 1846
- Aspidoglossa rivalis Putzeys, 1846
- Aspidoglossa ruficollis Putzeys, 1866
- Aspidoglossa schach (Fabricius, 1792)
- Aspidoglossa semicrenata (Chaudoir, 1843)
- Aspidoglossa sphaerodera (Reiche, 1842)
- Aspidoglossa striatipennis (Gory, 1833)
- Aspidoglossa subangulata (Chaudoir, 1843)
- Aspidoglossa submetallica Putzeys, 1846
- Aspidoglossa szekessyi Kult, 1950
- Aspidoglossa torrida Putzeys, 1846
