= Clivina transversa =

Scientific classification
- Domain: Eukaryota
- Kingdom: Animalia
- Phylum: Arthropoda
- Class: Insecta
- Order: Coleoptera
- Suborder: Adephaga
- Family: Carabidae
- Genus: Clivina
- Species: C. transversa

Binomial name
- Clivina transversa Putzeys, 1866

Species of beetle

Clivina transversa is a species of ground beetle in the subfamily Scaritinae. It was described by Jules Putzeys in 1866.
