= Ancus =

Ancus may refer to:

- Ancus (beetle), a genus of beetles in the family Carabidae
- Ancus Marcius (7th century BC), king of Rome
- 14088 Ancus, an asteroid
- Ancus, an Italic praenomen
- A part of a male Lepidoptera genitalia

== See also ==
- Ankus, a tool employed in the handling and training of elephants
