= Aspidoglossa submetallica =

Scientific classification
- Domain: Eukaryota
- Kingdom: Animalia
- Phylum: Arthropoda
- Class: Insecta
- Order: Coleoptera
- Suborder: Adephaga
- Family: Carabidae
- Genus: Aspidoglossa
- Species: A. submetallica

Binomial name
- Aspidoglossa submetallica Putzeys, 1846

Species of beetle

Aspidoglossa submetallica is a species of ground beetle in the subfamily Scaritinae. It was described by Putzeys in 1846.
