= Harpalus reflexus =

Scientific classification
- Kingdom: Animalia
- Phylum: Arthropoda
- Class: Insecta
- Order: Coleoptera
- Suborder: Adephaga
- Family: Carabidae
- Genus: Harpalus
- Species: H. reflexus

Binomial name
- Harpalus reflexus Putzeys, 1878

Species of beetle

Harpalus reflexus is a species of ground beetle in the subfamily Harpalinae. It was described by Jules Putzeys in 1878.
