= Clivina castanea =

Scientific classification
- Kingdom: Animalia
- Phylum: Arthropoda
- Class: Insecta
- Order: Coleoptera
- Suborder: Adephaga
- Family: Carabidae
- Genus: Clivina
- Species: C. castanea

Binomial name
- Clivina castanea Westwood, 1837

Species of beetle

Clivina castanea is a species of ground beetle in the subfamily Scaritinae. It was described by Westwood in 1837.
