= Calosoma blaptoides =

Scientific classification
- Kingdom: Animalia
- Phylum: Arthropoda
- Class: Insecta
- Order: Coleoptera
- Suborder: Adephaga
- Family: Carabidae
- Genus: Calosoma
- Species: C. blaptoides

Binomial name
- Calosoma blaptoides Putzeys, 1845

Synonyms
- Eutelodontus aztecus Géhin, 1881; Calopachys oaxacaensis Lassalle, 2009; Eutelodontus tehuacanus Lapouge, 1924

Species of beetle

Calosoma blaptoides, the hurtful beautiful thickish searcher, is a species of ground beetle in the subfamily of Carabinae. It was described by Jules Putzeys in 1845. This species is found in Mexico (Guanajuato, Oaxaca, Puebla, Veracruz), where it inhabits oak-pine forests and meadows.

Adults are brachypterous and nocturnal.
