= Trechus artemisiae =

Scientific classification
- Domain: Eukaryota
- Kingdom: Animalia
- Phylum: Arthropoda
- Class: Insecta
- Order: Coleoptera
- Suborder: Adephaga
- Family: Carabidae
- Genus: Trechus
- Species: T. artemisiae

Binomial name
- Trechus artemisiae Putzeys, 1872

Species of beetle

Trechus artemisiae is a species of ground beetle in the subfamily Trechinae. It was described by Jules Putzeys in 1872.
