= Semiclivina =

Scientific classification
- Kingdom: Animalia
- Phylum: Arthropoda
- Class: Insecta
- Order: Coleoptera
- Suborder: Adephaga
- Family: Carabidae
- Subtribe: Clivinina
- Genus: Semiclivina; Kult, 1947

Genus of beetles

Semiclivina is a genus of beetles in the family Carabidae, containing the following species:

- Semiclivina bergeri Dostal, 2011
- Semiclivina dentipes Dejean, 1825
- Semiclivina doolani (Baehr, 2008)
- Semiclivina oxyomma (Putzeys, 1868)
- Semiclivina schmidi Dostal, 2011
- Semiclivina urophthalma Putzeys, 1861
- Semiclivina urophthalmoides Kult, 1947
- Semiclivina vespertina Putzeys, 1866
