= Oxydrepanus rufus =

Scientific classification
- Domain: Eukaryota
- Kingdom: Animalia
- Phylum: Arthropoda
- Class: Insecta
- Order: Coleoptera
- Suborder: Adephaga
- Family: Carabidae
- Genus: Oxydrepanus
- Species: O. rufus

Binomial name
- Oxydrepanus rufus (Putzeys, 1846)

Species of beetle

Oxydrepanus rufus is a species of ground beetle in the family Carabidae. It is found in the Caribbean Sea, Central America, and North America.
