= Athrostictus punctatulus =

Scientific classification
- Kingdom: Animalia
- Phylum: Arthropoda
- Clade: Pancrustacea
- Class: Insecta
- Order: Coleoptera
- Suborder: Adephaga
- Family: Carabidae
- Genus: Athrostictus
- Species: A. punctatulus

Binomial name
- Athrostictus punctatulus (Putzeys, 1878)

Synonyms
- Selenophorus perpolitus Casey, 1884

Species of beetle

Athrostictus punctatulus is a species of ground beetle in the family Carabidae. It is found in Central America and North America.
