= Pyramoides =

Scientific classification
- Kingdom: Animalia
- Phylum: Arthropoda
- Class: Insecta
- Order: Coleoptera
- Suborder: Adephaga
- Family: Carabidae
- Subtribe: Clivinina
- Genus: Pyramoides; Bousquet, 2002

Genus of beetles

Pyramoides is a genus of beetles in the family Carabidae, containing the following species:

- Pyramoides crassicornis (Putzeys, 1846)
- Pyramoides oblongicollis (Putzeys, 1861)
