= Metius incertus =

Scientific classification
- Kingdom: Animalia
- Phylum: Arthropoda
- Class: Insecta
- Order: Coleoptera
- Suborder: Adephaga
- Family: Carabidae
- Genus: Metius
- Species: M. incertus

Binomial name
- Metius incertus (Putzeys, 1875)

Species of beetle

Metius incertus is a species of ground beetle in the subfamily Pterostichinae. It was described by Jules Putzeys in 1875.
