= Ancus (beetle) =

Scientific classification
- Domain: Eukaryota
- Kingdom: Animalia
- Phylum: Arthropoda
- Class: Insecta
- Order: Coleoptera
- Suborder: Adephaga
- Family: Carabidae
- Subfamily: Scaritinae
- Tribe: Clivinini
- Subtribe: Clivinina
- Genus: Ancus; Putzeys, 1867

Genus of beetles

Ancus is a genus in the ground beetle family Carabidae. There are about seven described species in Ancus, found in South America and Southeast Asia.

== Species ==
These seven species belong to the genus Ancus:

- Ancus bicornutus (Putzeys, 1861) (Colombia, Peru, and Brazil)
- Ancus cariniceps Andrewes, 1936 (Indonesia)
- Ancus depressifrons Putzeys, 1867 (Brazil)
- Ancus excavaticeps Putzeys, 1867 (Thailand, Vietnam, and Malaysia)
- Ancus hiekei Balkenohl, 2016 (Laos)
- Ancus principes Balkenohl, 2016 (Thailand)
- Ancus sulcicollis Putzeys, 1867 (Venezuela, Peru, and Brazil)
