= Cylindronotum aeneum =

Scientific classification
- Domain: Eukaryota
- Kingdom: Animalia
- Phylum: Arthropoda
- Class: Insecta
- Order: Coleoptera
- Suborder: Adephaga
- Family: Carabidae
- Genus: Cylindronotum
- Species: C. aeneum

Binomial name
- Cylindronotum aeneum Putzeys, 1845

Species of beetle

Cylindronotum aeneum is a species of ground beetle in the family Carabidae. It is found in North America.
