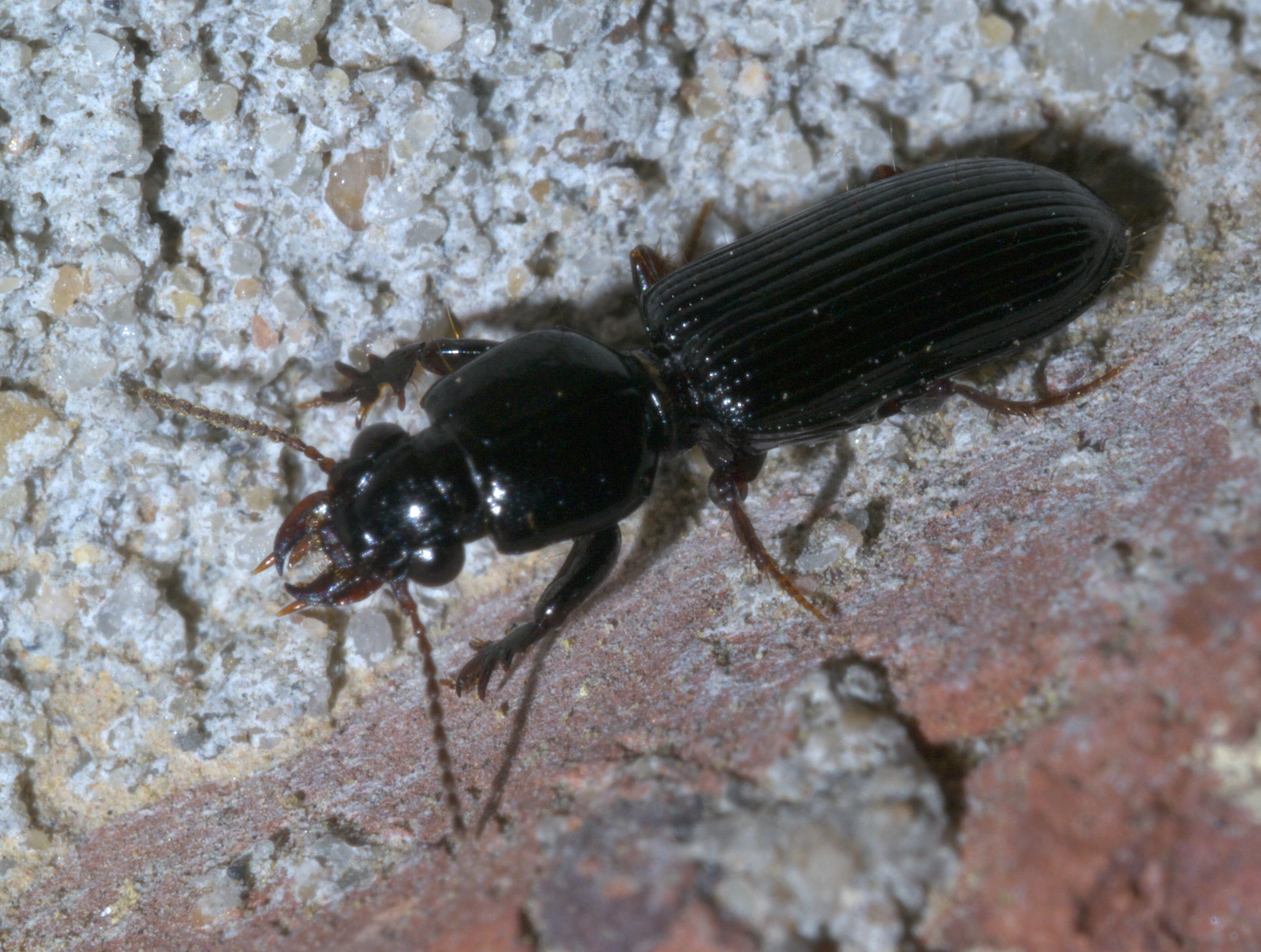

Scientific classification
- Kingdom: Animalia
- Phylum: Arthropoda
- Class: Insecta
- Order: Coleoptera
- Suborder: Adephaga
- Family: Carabidae
- Subfamily: Scaritinae
- Tribe: Clivinini
- Subtribe: Clivinina
- Genus: Semiclivina
- Species: S. dentipes

Binomial name
- Semiclivina dentipes (Dejean, 1825)

Synonyms
- Clivina dentipes Dejean, 1825

= Semiclivina dentipes =

Species of beetle

Semiclivina dentipes is a species of ground beetle in the family Carabidae, found in North America.
