= Oxydrepanus =

Scientific classification
- Kingdom: Animalia
- Phylum: Arthropoda
- Class: Insecta
- Order: Coleoptera
- Suborder: Adephaga
- Family: Carabidae
- Subtribe: Clivinina
- Genus: Oxydrepanus; Putzeys, 1866

Genus of beetles

Oxydrepanus is a genus of beetles in the family Carabidae, containing the following species:

- Oxydrepanus amrishi Makhan, 2010
- Oxydrepanus brasiliensis Putzeys, 1866
- Oxydrepanus bulirschi Dostal & L. M. Vieira, 2018
- Oxydrepanus coamensis (Mutchler, 1934)
- Oxydrepanus cristalensis Zayas, 1988
- Oxydrepanus cubanus Zayas, 1988
- Oxydrepanus luridus Putzeys, 1866
- Oxydrepanus mexicanus Putzeys, 1866
- Oxydrepanus micans Putzeys, 1866
- Oxydrepanus minae Makhan & Ezzatpanah, 2011
- Oxydrepanus minimus Putzeys, 1866
- Oxydrepanus minor (Kult, 1950)
- Oxydrepanus ovalis Putzeys, 1866
- Oxydrepanus ovoideus (Kult, 1950)
- Oxydrepanus reicheoides Darlington, 1939
- Oxydrepanus rishwani Makhan, 2010
- Oxydrepanus rufus (Putzeys, 1846)
- Oxydrepanus valdesi Dostal & L. M. Vieira, 2018
