= Selenophorus striatopunctatus =

Scientific classification
- Kingdom: Animalia
- Phylum: Arthropoda
- Clade: Pancrustacea
- Class: Insecta
- Order: Coleoptera
- Suborder: Adephaga
- Family: Carabidae
- Subfamily: Harpalinae
- Tribe: Harpalini
- Genus: Selenophorus
- Species: S. striatopunctatus

Binomial name
- Selenophorus striatopunctatus Putzeys, 1878

Synonyms
- Selenophorus depressulus (Casey, 1914); Selenophorus vigilans (Casey, 1914)

Species of beetle

Selenophorus striatopunctatus is a species of ground beetle in the family Carabidae. It is found in the Caribbean, Central America, North America, and South America.
