= Selenophorus palliatus =

Scientific classification
- Kingdom: Animalia
- Phylum: Arthropoda
- Class: Insecta
- Order: Coleoptera
- Suborder: Adephaga
- Family: Carabidae
- Tribe: Harpalini
- Genus: Selenophorus
- Species: S. palliatus

Binomial name
- Selenophorus palliatus (Fabricius, 1798)

Species of beetle

Selenophorus palliatus is a species of ground beetle in the family Carabidae. It is found in North America.
