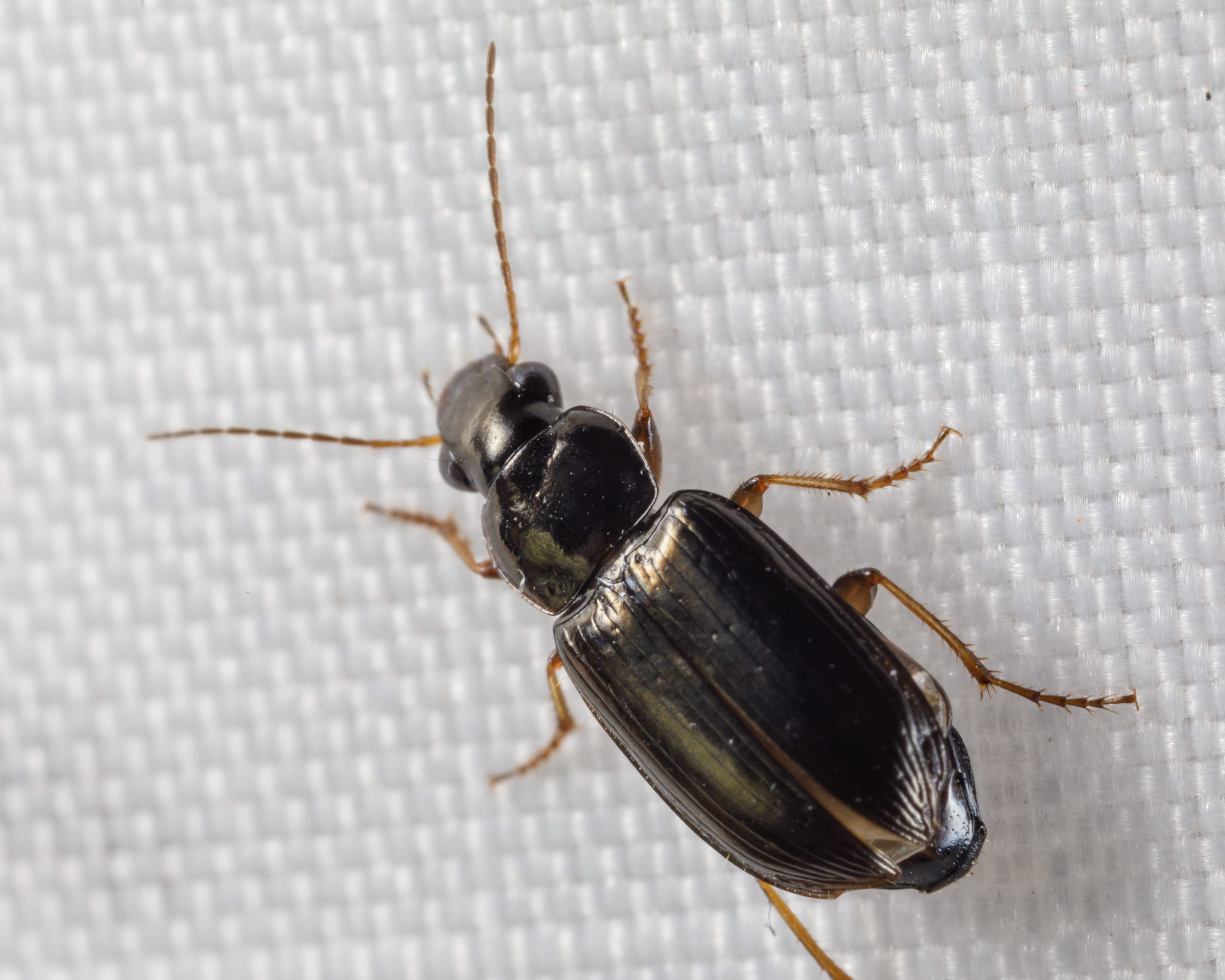
- Selenophorus fatuus, Texas

Scientific classification
- Domain: Eukaryota
- Kingdom: Animalia
- Phylum: Arthropoda
- Class: Insecta
- Order: Coleoptera
- Suborder: Adephaga
- Family: Carabidae
- Subfamily: Harpalinae
- Tribe: Harpalini
- Genus: Selenophorus; Dejean, 1831

Subgenera
- Celiamorphus Casey, 1914; Selenophorus Dejean, 1829

= Selenophorus =

Genus of beetles

Selenophorus is a genus of beetles in the family Carabidae, first described by Pierre François Marie Auguste Dejean in 1831.

== Species ==
Selenophorus contains the following 170 species:

- Selenophorus abaxoides Reiche, 1843
- Selenophorus acutangulus (Putzeys, 1878)
- Selenophorus aeneopiceus Casey, 1884
- Selenophorus aequinoctialis Dejean, 1829
- Selenophorus affinis Dejean, 1831
- Selenophorus agilis Putzeys, 1878
- Selenophorus agonoides (Putzeys, 1878)
- Selenophorus alternans Dejean, 1829
- Selenophorus amaroides Dejean, 1829
- Selenophorus anceps Dejean, 1831
- Selenophorus angulatus Chaudoir, 1843
- Selenophorus antarcticus Steinheil, 1869
- Selenophorus apicalis Putzeys, 1878
- Selenophorus assimilis Putzeys, 1878
- Selenophorus aureocupreus Bates, 1891
- Selenophorus aurichalceus Dejean, 1831
- Selenophorus balli Messer & Raber, 2021
- Selenophorus barbadensis Ball & Shpeley, 1992
- Selenophorus barysomoides Putzeys, 1878
- Selenophorus batesi Putzeys, 1878
- Selenophorus blanchardi Manee, 1915
- Selenophorus blandus Dejean, 1829
- Selenophorus bradycelloides Bates, 1891
- Selenophorus brasiliensis (Chaudoir, 1837)
- Selenophorus brevis (Putzeys, 1878)
- Selenophorus breviusculus G.Horn, 1880
- Selenophorus callistichus Bates, 1878
- Selenophorus cardionotus Putzeys, 1878
- Selenophorus cayennensis Fauvel, 1861
- Selenophorus chalceus Putzeys, 1878
- Selenophorus chalcosomus Reiche, 1843
- Selenophorus chaparralus Purrington, 2000
- Selenophorus chiriquinus Bates, 1882
- Selenophorus chryses Bates, 1884
- Selenophorus clypealis Ball & Shpeley, 1992
- Selenophorus concinnus Schaeffer, 1910
- Selenophorus confinis R.F.Sahlberg, 1847
- Selenophorus contractus (Casey, 1914)
- Selenophorus coracinus Dejean, 1831
- Selenophorus cordatus Putzeys, 1878
- Selenophorus curvipes Putzeys, 1878
- Selenophorus cyaneus Putzeys, 1878
- Selenophorus cyclogonus (Putzeys, 1878)
- Selenophorus dessalinesi Ball & Shpeley, 1992
- Selenophorus dichromatus Casey, 1914
- Selenophorus dilutipes Putzeys, 1878
- Selenophorus dimidiatulus Emden, 1958
- Selenophorus discopunctatus Dejean, 1829
- Selenophorus dispar Bates, 1891
- Selenophorus distinctus Putzeys, 1878
- Selenophorus dives Bates, 1884
- Selenophorus dubius Putzeys, 1878
- Selenophorus ellipticus Dejean, 1829
- Selenophorus elytrostictus Messer & Raber, 2021
- Selenophorus emarginatus Putzeys, 1878
- Selenophorus emendi Reichardt, 1976
- Selenophorus exilis Dejean, 1831
- Selenophorus fabricii Shpeley; Hunting & Ball, 2017
- Selenophorus faldermanni Putzeys, 1878
- Selenophorus fatuus (LeConte, 1863)
- Selenophorus flavilabris Dejean, 1829
- Selenophorus flavipes Putzeys, 1878
- Selenophorus fossulatus Dejean, 1829
- Selenophorus foveatus Putzeys, 1878
- Selenophorus foveolatus Chaudoir, 1843
- Selenophorus fulvicornis Putzeys, 1878
- Selenophorus gagatinus Dejean, 1829
- Selenophorus galapagoensis G.R.Waterhouse, 1845
- Selenophorus genuinus Putzeys, 1878
- Selenophorus granarius Dejean, 1829
- Selenophorus hepburni Bates, 1884
- Selenophorus hylacis (Say, 1823)
- Selenophorus illustris Putzeys, 1878
- Selenophorus insularis Boheman, 1858
- Selenophorus integer (Fabricius, 1798)
- Selenophorus intermedius (Putzeys, 1878)
- Selenophorus irec Shpeley; Hunting & Ball, 2017
- Selenophorus irideus Reiche, 1843
- Selenophorus irinus (Reiche, 1843)
- Selenophorus iviei Shpeley; Hunting & Ball, 2017
- Selenophorus lacordairei Dejean, 1831
- Selenophorus laevicollis (Bates, 1884)
- Selenophorus latior Darlington, 1934
- Selenophorus limbolaris Perty, 1830
- Selenophorus liodiscus Putzeys, 1878
- Selenophorus lubricipes Dejean, 1831
- Selenophorus lugubris Putzeys, 1878
- Selenophorus marginepilosus Steinheil, 1869
- Selenophorus marginepunctatus (Dejean, 1829)
- Selenophorus maritimus Casey, 1914
- Selenophorus mendicus Putzeys, 1878
- Selenophorus mexicanus (Putzeys, 1878)
- Selenophorus misellus Putzeys, 1878
- Selenophorus modestus Putzeys, 1878
- Selenophorus multiporus Bates, 1884
- Selenophorus multipunctatus Dejean, 1829
- Selenophorus mundus Putzeys, 1878
- Selenophorus myrmidon Dejean, 1831
- Selenophorus neoruficollis Messer & Raber, 2021
- Selenophorus nonellipticus Messer & Raber, 2021
- Selenophorus nonseriatus Darlington, 1934
- Selenophorus obscuricornis (G.R.Waterhouse, 1845)
- Selenophorus obscurus Putzeys, 1878
- Selenophorus obtusoides Shpeley; Hunting & Ball, 2017
- Selenophorus obtusus Dejean, 1829
- Selenophorus opacus Putzeys, 1878
- Selenophorus opalinus (LeConte, 1863)
- Selenophorus palliatus (Fabricius, 1798)
- Selenophorus pampicola Steinheil, 1869
- Selenophorus paramundus Ball & Shpeley, 1992
- Selenophorus pararuficollis Messer & Raber, 2021
- Selenophorus parumpunctatus Dejean, 1829
- Selenophorus parvus Darlington, 1934
- Selenophorus pedicularius Dejean, 1829
- Selenophorus placidus (Putzeys, 1878)
- Selenophorus planipennis LeConte, 1847
- Selenophorus pleuriticus Putzeys, 1878
- Selenophorus poeciloides Putzeys, 1878
- Selenophorus promptus Dejean, 1829
- Selenophorus propinquus Putzeys, 1874
- Selenophorus pseudomundus Ball & Shpeley, 1992
- Selenophorus pulcherrimus Emden, 1949
- Selenophorus pullus Dejean, 1829
- Selenophorus pumilus Messer & Raber, 2021
- Selenophorus punctiger Kirsch, 1873
- Selenophorus punctipennis Putzeys, 1878
- Selenophorus punctulatus Dejean, 1829
- Selenophorus pusillus Putzeys, 1878
- Selenophorus pusio Putzeys, 1878
- Selenophorus putzeysi Csiki, 1932
- Selenophorus pyritosus Dejean, 1829
- Selenophorus rileyi Messer & Raber, 2021
- Selenophorus rodriguezi Putzeys, 1878
- Selenophorus rufescens Putzeys, 1878
- Selenophorus ruficollis (Putzeys, 1878)
- Selenophorus rufulus Putzeys, 1878
- Selenophorus rugipennis Putzeys, 1878
- Selenophorus rugulosus Putzeys, 1878
- Selenophorus sallei Putzeys, 1878
- Selenophorus satyrus Putzeys, 1878
- Selenophorus schaefferi Csiki, 1932
- Selenophorus scitulus Dejean, 1829
- Selenophorus semirufus Bates, 1882
- Selenophorus seriatoporus Putzeys, 1878
- Selenophorus sinuaticollis Notman, 1922
- Selenophorus solitarius Darlington, 1934
- Selenophorus spinosus Shpeley; Hunting & Ball, 2017
- Selenophorus splendidus Putzeys, 1878
- Selenophorus steinheili Blackwelder, 1944
- Selenophorus striatopunctatus Putzeys, 1878
- Selenophorus suavis Bates, 1884
- Selenophorus subaeneus Reiche, 1843
- Selenophorus subcordatus Putzeys, 1878
- Selenophorus subquadratus (Putzeys, 1878)
- Selenophorus subsinuatus Putzeys, 1878
- Selenophorus tarsalis Putzeys, 1878
- Selenophorus tesselatus Putzeys, 1878
- Selenophorus tibialis Putzeys, 1878
- Selenophorus trepidus (Casey, 1924)
- Selenophorus tubericauda Bates, 1884
- Selenophorus undatus Messer & Raber, 2021
- Selenophorus valgus Bates, 1882
- Selenophorus variabilis Curtis, 1839
- Selenophorus variegatus Dejean, 1831
- Selenophorus ventralis Putzeys, 1878
- Selenophorus vicinus Dejean, 1829
- Selenophorus vilis Putzeys, 1878
- Selenophorus woodruffi Ball & Shpeley, 1992
- Selenophorus xantholomus Putzeys, 1878
- Selenophorus yucatanus Putzeys, 1878
