= Metius negrei =

Scientific classification
- Kingdom: Animalia
- Phylum: Arthropoda
- Class: Insecta
- Order: Coleoptera
- Suborder: Adephaga
- Family: Carabidae
- Genus: Metius
- Species: M. negrei

Binomial name
- Metius negrei Straneo, 1977

Species of beetle

Metius negrei is a species of ground beetle in the subfamily Pterostichinae. It was described by Straneo in 1977.
