= Cylindronotum =

Scientific classification
- Kingdom: Animalia
- Phylum: Arthropoda
- Class: Insecta
- Order: Coleoptera
- Suborder: Adephaga
- Family: Carabidae
- Subtribe: Calleidina
- Genus: Cylindronotum; Putzeys, 1846

Genus of beetles

Cylindronotum is a genus of beetles in the family Carabidae, containing the following species:

- Cylindronotum aeneum Putzeys, 1845
- Cylindronotum chalceum (Kirsch, 1873)
- Cylindronotum crenulatum (Chaudoir, 1872)
- Cylindronotum cursorium Chaudoir, 1848
- Cylindronotum lissonotum (Chaudoir, 1872)
- Cylindronotum nevermanni Emden, 1949
- Cylindronotum reichei (Chaudoir, 1872)
