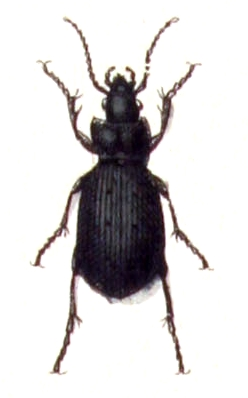

Scientific classification
- Kingdom: Animalia
- Phylum: Arthropoda
- Clade: Pancrustacea
- Class: Insecta
- Order: Coleoptera
- Suborder: Adephaga
- Family: Carabidae
- Genus: Selenophorus
- Species: S. parumpunctatus

Binomial name
- Selenophorus parumpunctatus Dejean, 1829

Synonyms
- Selenophorus mustus Casey, 1914

= Selenophorus parumpunctatus =

Species of beetle

Selenophorus parumpunctatus is a species of ground beetle in the family Carabidae. It is found in the Caribbean and North America.
