= Metius (beetle) =

Scientific classification
- Kingdom: Animalia
- Phylum: Arthropoda
- Class: Insecta
- Order: Coleoptera
- Suborder: Adephaga
- Family: Carabidae
- Subfamily: Pterostichinae
- Genus: Metius; Curtis, 1839

Genus of beetles

Metius is a genus of beetles in the family Carabidae, containing the following species:

- Metius aeneus (Dejean, 1831)
- Metius andicola (Dejean, 1831)
- Metius annulicornis Curtis, 1839
- Metius apicalis Straneo, 1986
- Metius auratoides Straneo, 1986
- Metius blandus (Dejean, 1828)
- Metius bolivianus Straneo, 1951
- Metius bonariensis (Putzeys, 1875)
- Metius brunnescens Straneo, 1951
- Metius canotae Steinheil, 1869
- Metius carnifex (Dejean, 1828)
- Metius caudatus (Putzeys, 1875)
- Metius chilensis (Dejean, 1831)
- Metius circumfusus (Germar, 1824)
- Metius confusus Straneo, 1951
- Metius constrictus Straneo, 1951
- Metius cordatulus Straneo, 1951
- Metius cordatus (Putzeys, 1875)
- Metius eurypterus (Putzeys, 1875)
- Metius femoratus (Dejean, 1828)
- Metius flavipes (Dejean, 1828)
- Metius flavipleuris Straneo, 1951
- Metius foveolatus (Putzeys, 1875)
- Metius gigas Straneo, 1953
- Metius gilvipes (Dejean, 1828)
- Metius guillermoi Will, 2005
- Metius harpaloides Curtis, 1839
- Metius hassenteufeli Straneo, 1960
- Metius incertus (Putzeys, 1875)
- Metius kulti Straneo, 1952
- Metius kuscheli Straneo, 1955
- Metius latemarginatus Straneo, 1951
- Metius latigastricus (Dejean, 1828)
- Metius latior Putzeys, 1875
- Metius loeffleri Straneo, 1986
- Metius luridus (Chaudoir, 1837)
- Metius malachiticus (Dejean, 1828)
- Metius marginatus (Dejean, 1828)
- Metius mateui Straneo, 1986
- Metius melancholicus Straneo, 1952
- Metius negrei Straneo, 1977
- Metius niger (Motschulsky, 1866)
- Metius obscurus (Putzeys, 1875)
- Metius obtusus Straneo, 1951
- Metius parvicollis (Putzeys, 1875)
- Metius parvulus Straneo, 1952
- Metius peruvianus Straneo, 1951
- Metius pogonoides (Fairmaire, 1883)
- Metius punctulatus Putzeys, 1875
- Metius robustus Straneo, 1951
- Metius rotundatus Straneo, 1951
- Metius rotundicollis Straneo, 1951
- Metius silvestrii Straneo, 1951
- Metius striatus (Putzeys, 1875)
- Metius striolatus Straneo, 1951
- Metius subcoeruleus Straneo, 1951
- Metius subfoveolatus Straneo, 1951
- Metius submetallicus Straneo, 1986
- Metius subsericeus Straneo, 1952
- Metius titschacki Straneo, 1951
- Metius viridulus Straneo, 1953
- Metius zischkai Straneo, 1960
