= Aspidoglossa sphaerodera =

Scientific classification
- Domain: Eukaryota
- Kingdom: Animalia
- Phylum: Arthropoda
- Class: Insecta
- Order: Coleoptera
- Suborder: Adephaga
- Family: Carabidae
- Genus: Aspidoglossa
- Species: A. sphaerodera

Binomial name
- Aspidoglossa sphaerodera (Reiche, 1842)

Species of beetle

Aspidoglossa sphaerodera is a species of ground beetle in the subfamily Scaritinae. It was described by Reiche in 1842.
