= Selenophorus aequinoctialis =

Scientific classification
- Kingdom: Animalia
- Phylum: Arthropoda
- Class: Insecta
- Order: Coleoptera
- Suborder: Adephaga
- Family: Carabidae
- Subfamily: Harpalinae
- Tribe: Harpalini
- Genus: Selenophorus
- Species: S. aequinoctialis

Binomial name
- Selenophorus aequinoctialis Dejean, 1829

Synonyms
- Selenophorus famulus Casey, 1914

Species of beetle

Selenophorus aequinoctialis is a species of ground beetle in the family Carabidae. It is found in North America and South America.
