= Metius malachiticus =

Scientific classification
- Kingdom: Animalia
- Phylum: Arthropoda
- Class: Insecta
- Order: Coleoptera
- Suborder: Adephaga
- Family: Carabidae
- Genus: Metius
- Species: M. malachiticus

Binomial name
- Metius malachiticus (Dejean, 1828)

Species of beetle

Metius malachiticus is a species of ground beetle in the subfamily Pterostichinae. It was described by Dejean in 1828.
