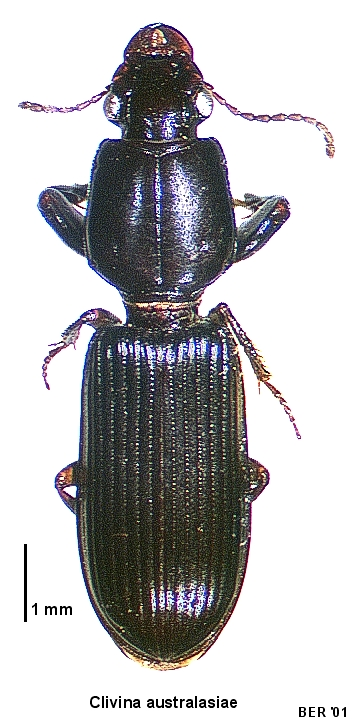

Scientific classification
- Domain: Eukaryota
- Kingdom: Animalia
- Phylum: Arthropoda
- Class: Insecta
- Order: Coleoptera
- Suborder: Adephaga
- Family: Carabidae
- Genus: Clivina
- Species: C. australasiae

Binomial name
- Clivina australasiae Boheman, 1858

= Clivina australasiae =

Species of beetle

Clivina australasiae is a species of ground beetle in the subfamily Scaritinae. It was described by Boheman in 1858.
