= Aspidoglossa mexicana =

Scientific classification
- Domain: Eukaryota
- Kingdom: Animalia
- Phylum: Arthropoda
- Class: Insecta
- Order: Coleoptera
- Suborder: Adephaga
- Family: Carabidae
- Genus: Aspidoglossa
- Species: A. mexicana

Binomial name
- Aspidoglossa mexicana (Chaudoir, 1837)

Species of beetle

Aspidoglossa mexicana is a species of ground beetle in the subfamily Scaritinae. It was described by Maximilien Chaudoir in 1837.
