= Metius parvulus =

Scientific classification
- Kingdom: Animalia
- Phylum: Arthropoda
- Class: Insecta
- Order: Coleoptera
- Suborder: Adephaga
- Family: Carabidae
- Genus: Metius
- Species: M. parvulus

Binomial name
- Metius parvulus Straneo, 1952

Species of beetle

Metius parvulus is a species of ground beetle in the subfamily Pterostichinae. It was described by Straneo in 1952.
