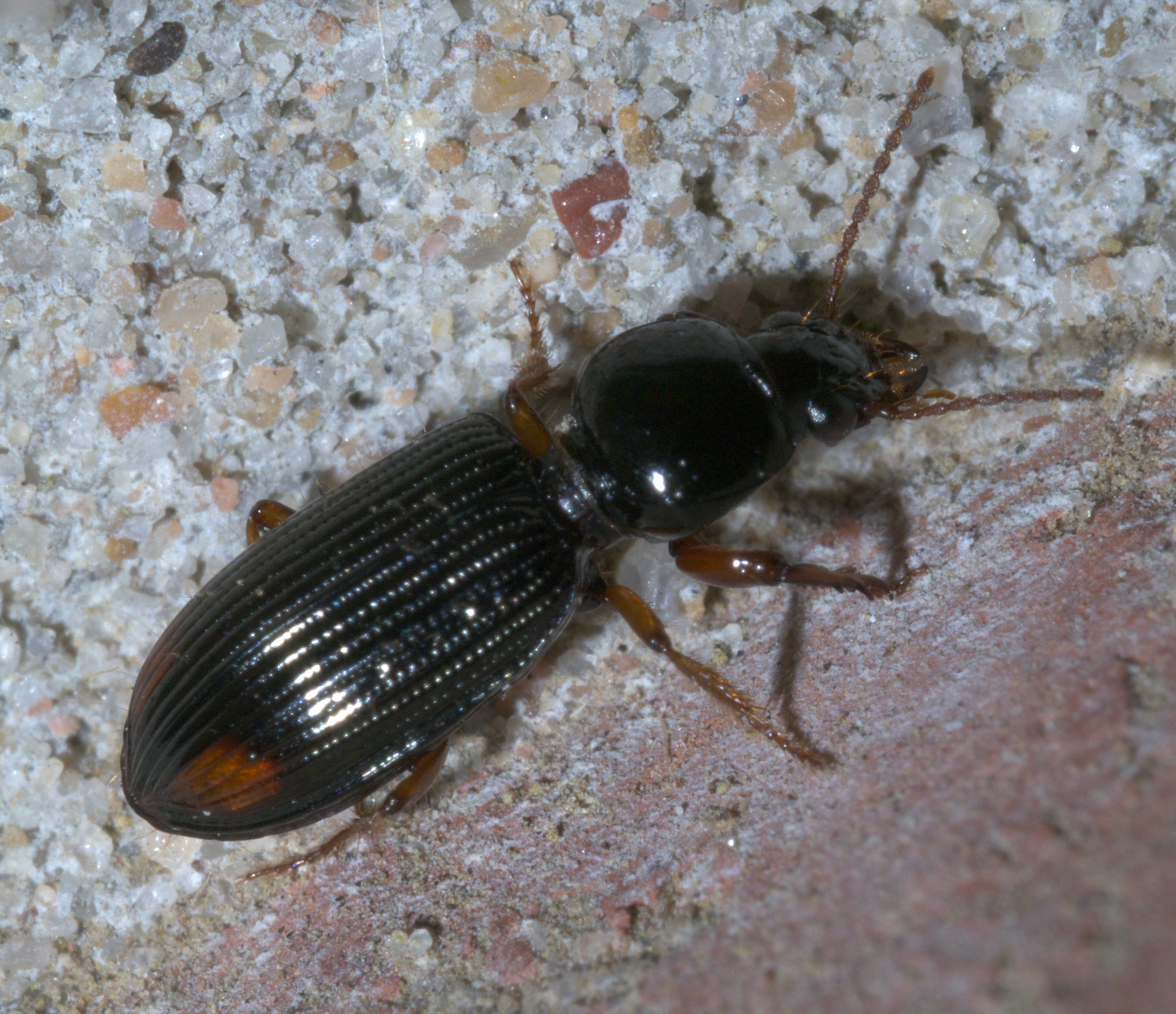

Scientific classification
- Domain: Eukaryota
- Kingdom: Animalia
- Phylum: Arthropoda
- Class: Insecta
- Order: Coleoptera
- Suborder: Adephaga
- Family: Carabidae
- Genus: Aspidoglossa
- Species: A. subangulata

Binomial name
- Aspidoglossa subangulata (Chaudoir, 1843)

= Aspidoglossa subangulata =

Species of beetle

Aspidoglossa subangulata is a species of ground beetle in the subfamily Scaritinae. It was described by Maximilien Chaudoir in 1843.
