= Metius confusus =

Scientific classification
- Kingdom: Animalia
- Phylum: Arthropoda
- Class: Insecta
- Order: Coleoptera
- Suborder: Adephaga
- Family: Carabidae
- Genus: Metius
- Species: M. confusus

Binomial name
- Metius confusus Straneo, 1951

Species of beetle

Metius confusus is a species of ground beetle in the subfamily Pterostichinae. It was described by Straneo in 1951.
