= Metius luridus =

Scientific classification
- Kingdom: Animalia
- Phylum: Arthropoda
- Class: Insecta
- Order: Coleoptera
- Suborder: Adephaga
- Family: Carabidae
- Genus: Metius
- Species: M. luridus

Binomial name
- Metius luridus (Chaudoir, 1837)

Species of beetle

Metius luridus is a species of ground beetle in the subfamily Pterostichinae. It was described by Maximilien Chaudoir in 1837.
