= Aspidoglossa szekessyi =

Scientific classification
- Domain: Eukaryota
- Kingdom: Animalia
- Phylum: Arthropoda
- Class: Insecta
- Order: Coleoptera
- Suborder: Adephaga
- Family: Carabidae
- Genus: Aspidoglossa
- Species: A. szekessyi

Binomial name
- Aspidoglossa szekessyi Kult, 1950

Species of beetle

Aspidoglossa szekessyi is a species of ground beetle in the subfamily Scaritinae. It was described by Kult in 1950.
