= Metius guillermoi =

Scientific classification
- Kingdom: Animalia
- Phylum: Arthropoda
- Class: Insecta
- Order: Coleoptera
- Suborder: Adephaga
- Family: Carabidae
- Genus: Metius
- Species: M. guillermoi

Binomial name
- Metius guillermoi Will, 2005

Species of beetle

Metius guillermoi is a species of ground beetle in the subfamily Pterostichinae. It was described by Will in 2005.
