= Athrostictus =

Scientific classification
- Domain: Eukaryota
- Kingdom: Animalia
- Phylum: Arthropoda
- Class: Insecta
- Order: Coleoptera
- Suborder: Adephaga
- Family: Carabidae
- Subfamily: Harpalinae
- Tribe: Harpalini
- Subtribe: Harpalina
- Genus: Athrostictus; Bates, 1878

Genus of beetles

Athrostictus is a genus of ground beetles in the family Carabidae.

== Species ==
These 18 species belong to the genus Athrostictus:

- Athrostictus chlaenioides (Dejean, 1829)
- Athrostictus circumfusus (Putzeys, 1878)
- Athrostictus gilvipes van Emden, 1935
- Athrostictus iridescens Chaudoir, 1843
- Athrostictus luctuosus (Reiche, 1843)
- Athrostictus luridus (Reiche, 1843)
- Athrostictus magus (Boheman, 1858)
- Athrostictus metallicus (Reiche, 1843)
- Athrostictus nobilis (Brullé, 1838)
- Athrostictus opalescens Bates, 1878
- Athrostictus paganus (Dejean, 1831)
- Athrostictus puberulus (Dejean, 1829)
- Athrostictus pubipennis (Boheman, 1858)
- Athrostictus punctatulus (Putzeys, 1878)
- Athrostictus rufilabris (Dejean, 1829)
- Athrostictus sericatus Bates, 1878
- Athrostictus sulcatulus (Dejean, 1829)
- Athrostictus velutinus (Putzeys, 1878)
- Athrostictus vicinus (Gory, 1833)
