= Aspidoglossa intermedia =

Scientific classification
- Kingdom: Animalia
- Phylum: Arthropoda
- Class: Insecta
- Order: Coleoptera
- Suborder: Adephaga
- Family: Carabidae
- Genus: Aspidoglossa
- Species: A. intermedia

Binomial name
- Aspidoglossa intermedia (Dejean, 1831)

Species of beetle

Aspidoglossa intermedia is a species of ground beetle in the subfamily Scaritinae. It was described by Pierre François Marie Auguste Dejean in 1831.
