= Selenophorus granarius =

Scientific classification
- Domain: Eukaryota
- Kingdom: Animalia
- Phylum: Arthropoda
- Class: Insecta
- Order: Coleoptera
- Suborder: Adephaga
- Family: Carabidae
- Subfamily: Harpalinae
- Tribe: Harpalini
- Genus: Selenophorus
- Species: S. granarius

Binomial name
- Selenophorus granarius Dejean, 1829

Species of beetle

Selenophorus granarius is a species of ground beetle in the family Carabidae. It lives in North America.
