= Metius circumfusus =

Scientific classification
- Kingdom: Animalia
- Phylum: Arthropoda
- Class: Insecta
- Order: Coleoptera
- Suborder: Adephaga
- Family: Carabidae
- Genus: Metius
- Species: M. circumfusus

Binomial name
- Metius circumfusus (Germar, 1824)

Species of beetle

Metius circumfusus is a species of ground beetle in the subfamily Pterostichinae. It was described by Ernst Friedrich Germar in 1824.
