= Metius harpaloides =

Scientific classification
- Kingdom: Animalia
- Phylum: Arthropoda
- Class: Insecta
- Order: Coleoptera
- Suborder: Adephaga
- Family: Carabidae
- Genus: Metius
- Species: M. harpaloides

Binomial name
- Metius harpaloides Curtis, 1839

Species of beetle

Metius harpaloides is a species of ground beetle in the subfamily Pterostichinae. It was described by John Curtis in 1839.
