= Metius niger =

Scientific classification
- Kingdom: Animalia
- Phylum: Arthropoda
- Class: Insecta
- Order: Coleoptera
- Suborder: Adephaga
- Family: Carabidae
- Genus: Metius
- Species: M. niger

Binomial name
- Metius niger Motschulsky, 1866

Species of beetle

Metius niger is a species of ground beetle in the subfamily Pterostichinae. It was described by Victor Motschulsky in 1866.
