= Aspidoglossa striatipennis =

Scientific classification
- Domain: Eukaryota
- Kingdom: Animalia
- Phylum: Arthropoda
- Class: Insecta
- Order: Coleoptera
- Suborder: Adephaga
- Family: Carabidae
- Genus: Aspidoglossa
- Species: A. striatipennis

Binomial name
- Aspidoglossa striatipennis (Gory, 1833)

Species of beetle

Aspidoglossa striatipennis is a species of ground beetle in the subfamily Scaritinae. It was described by Gory in 1833.
