= Metius annulicornis =

Scientific classification
- Kingdom: Animalia
- Phylum: Arthropoda
- Class: Insecta
- Order: Coleoptera
- Suborder: Adephaga
- Family: Carabidae
- Genus: Metius
- Species: M. annulicornis

Binomial name
- Metius annulicornis Curtis, 1839

Species of beetle

Metius annulicornis is a species of ground beetle in the subfamily Pterostichinae. It was described by John Curtis in 1839.
