= Metius canotae =

Scientific classification
- Kingdom: Animalia
- Phylum: Arthropoda
- Class: Insecta
- Order: Coleoptera
- Suborder: Adephaga
- Family: Carabidae
- Genus: Metius
- Species: M. canotae

Binomial name
- Metius canotae Steinheil, 1869

Species of beetle

Metius canotae is a species of ground beetle in the subfamily Pterostichinae. It was described by Steinheil in 1869.
