= Metius aeneus =

Scientific classification
- Kingdom: Animalia
- Phylum: Arthropoda
- Class: Insecta
- Order: Coleoptera
- Suborder: Adephaga
- Family: Carabidae
- Genus: Metius
- Species: M. aeneus

Binomial name
- Metius aeneus (Dejean, 1831)

Species of beetle

Metius aeneus is a species of ground beetle in the subfamily Pterostichinae. It was described by Dejean in 1831.
