= Aspidoglossa brachydera =

Scientific classification
- Domain: Eukaryota
- Kingdom: Animalia
- Phylum: Arthropoda
- Class: Insecta
- Order: Coleoptera
- Suborder: Adephaga
- Family: Carabidae
- Genus: Aspidoglossa
- Species: A. brachydera

Binomial name
- Aspidoglossa brachydera H. W. Bates, 1878

Species of beetle

Aspidoglossa brachydera is a species of ground beetle in the subfamily Scaritinae. It was described by Henry Walter Bates in 1878.
