= Metius pogonoides =

Scientific classification
- Kingdom: Animalia
- Phylum: Arthropoda
- Class: Insecta
- Order: Coleoptera
- Suborder: Adephaga
- Family: Carabidae
- Genus: Metius
- Species: M. pogonoides

Binomial name
- Metius pogonoides (Fairmaire, 1883)

Species of beetle

Metius pogonoides is a species of ground beetle in the subfamily Pterostichinae. It was described by Fairmaire in 1883.
