= Clivina acutimentum =

Scientific classification
- Kingdom: Animalia
- Phylum: Arthropoda
- Class: Insecta
- Order: Coleoptera
- Suborder: Adephaga
- Family: Carabidae
- Genus: Clivina
- Species: C. acutimentum

Binomial name
- Clivina acutimentum Balkenohl, 2021

Species of beetle

Clivina acutimentum is a species of medium sized ground beetle. It is native to Cambodia, northeast and central Thailand, and north Vietnam. It has a body length of 7.8–9.1 mm (0.31–0.36 in) and a width of 2.3–2.7 mm (0.091–0.106 in).
