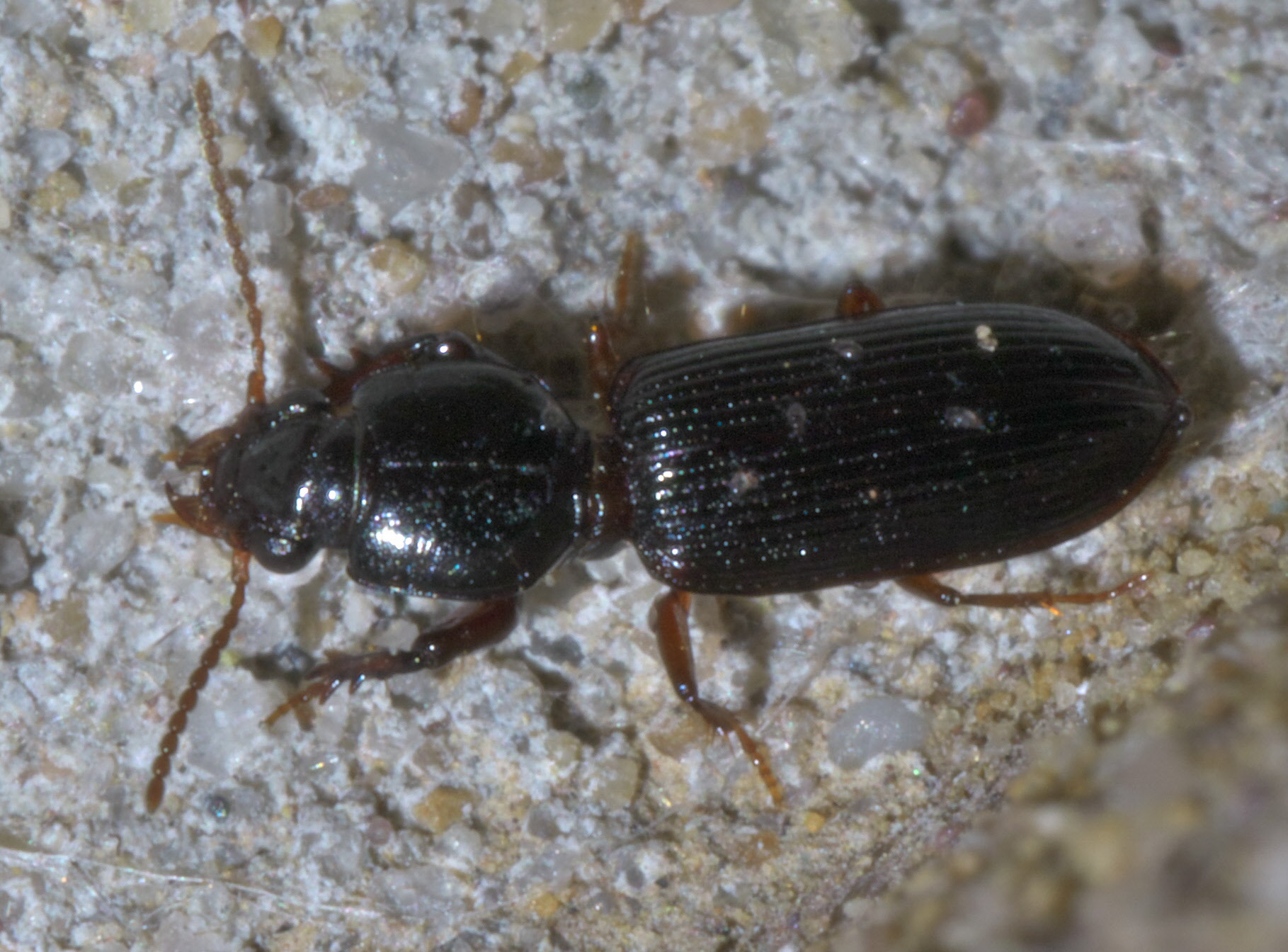
- Clivina

Scientific classification
- Domain: Eukaryota
- Kingdom: Animalia
- Phylum: Arthropoda
- Class: Insecta
- Order: Coleoptera
- Suborder: Adephaga
- Family: Carabidae
- Subfamily: Scaritinae
- Tribe: Clivinini; Rafinesque, 1815

Subtribes
- Androzelmina R.T.Bell, 1998; Ardistomina Putzeys, 1867; Clivinina Rafinesque, 1815; Forcipatorina Bänninger, 1938; Reicheiina Jeannel, 1957; Schizogeniina Dostal, 2017; Sparostesina Dostal, 2017

= Clivinini =

Tribe of beetles

Clivinini is a tribe of ground beetles in the family Carabidae. There are more than 70 genera and 1,200 described species in Clivinini.

== Genera ==
For a list of genera in Clivinini, see Scaritinae.
