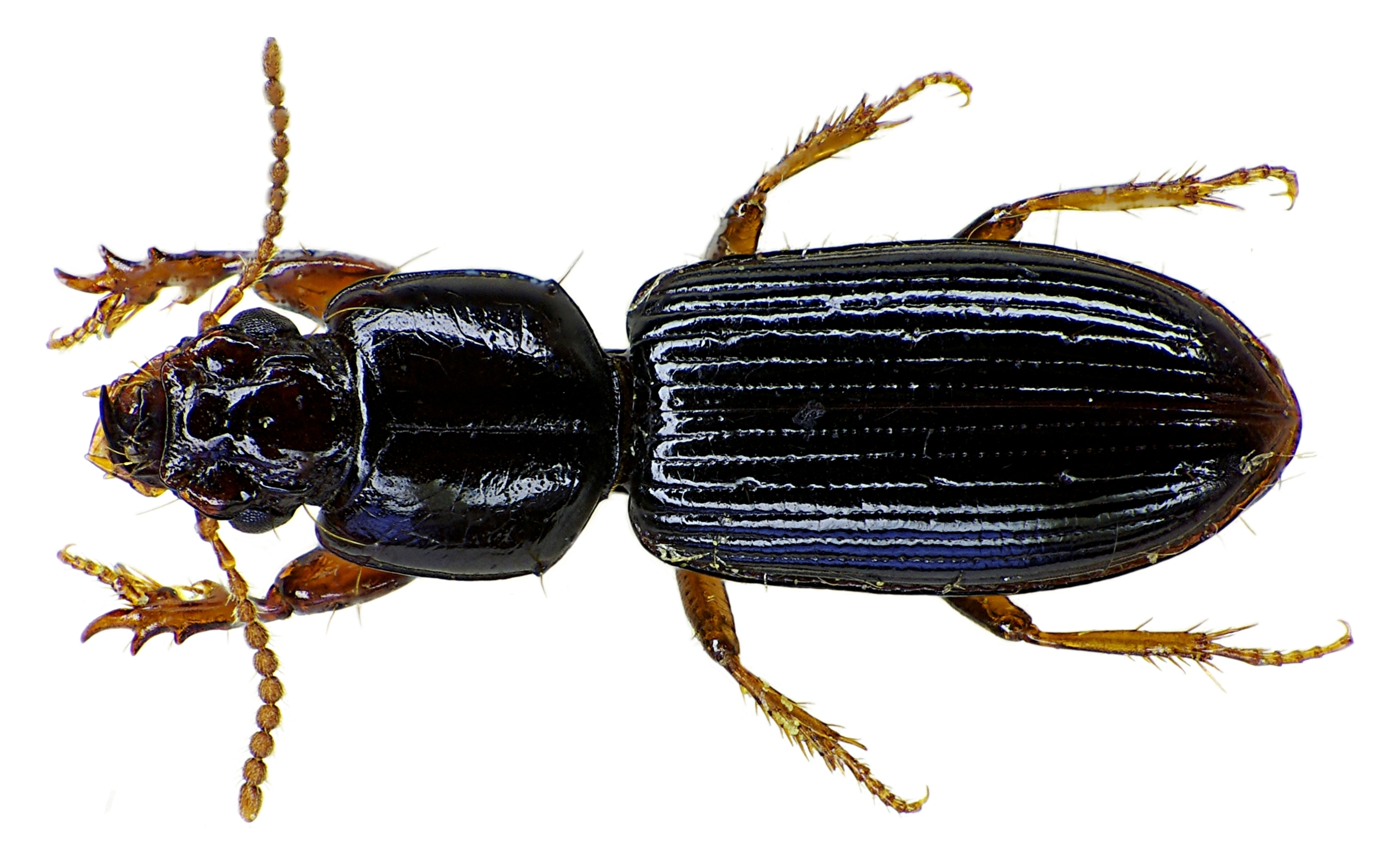
- Clivina fossor

Scientific classification
- Kingdom: Animalia
- Phylum: Arthropoda
- Class: Insecta
- Order: Coleoptera
- Suborder: Adephaga
- Family: Carabidae
- Subfamily: Scaritinae
- Tribe: Clivinini
- Subtribe: Clivinina
- Genus: Clivina; Latreille, 1802

Subgenera
- Antroforceps; Clivina; Cliviniella Kult, 1959; Dacca Putzeys, 1861; Eoclivina Kult, 1959; Leucocara; Paraclivina Kult, 1947; Physoclivina Kult, 1959; Semiclivina

Diversity
- at least 600 species

= Clivina =

Genus of beetles

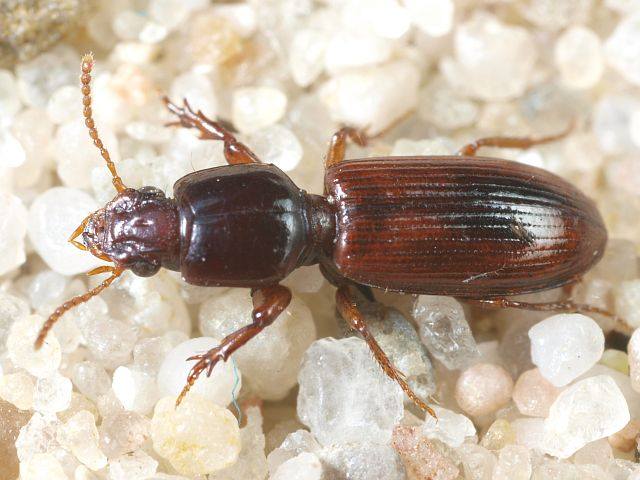
Clivina collaris

Clivina is a genus of ground beetle native to the Palearctic, the Nearctic, the Near East and North Africa. There are more than 600 described species in Clivina including Clivina acutimentum, Clivina australasiae and Clivina breviuscula.

== See also ==
- List of Clivina species
