= Jules Putzeys =

Belgian magistrate and entomologist (1809–1882)

- Born: 1 May 1809; Liège, First French Empire
- Died: 2 January 1882 (aged 72)
- Honours: Commander in the Order of Leopold

Jules Antoine Adolphe Henri Putzeys (1 May 1809 – 2 January 1882) was a Belgian magistrate and an entomologist who took a special interest in the beetles belonging to the family Carabidae.

Putzeys was born in Liège and obtained a doctoral degree at the age of 20. He worked at the court of appeal in Liège and later as a substitute for the public prosecutor in Arlon. He moved to the Ministry of Justice in Brussels in 1840 and became a Secretary General in 1858. He was a member of the Commission Centrale de Statistique and was government commissioner for general and international statistics from 1879. He retired in 1880.

In 1851, he was appointed a knight in the Order of Leopold and in 1871 a commander.

Putzeys was also a respected amateur entomologist specializing in the study of beetles belonging to the family Carabidae. He was a close associate of Baron Maximilien de Chaudoir (1816–1881). He bequeathed his collection to the Royal Belgian Institute of Natural Sciences in Brussels. A variety of Begonia rex is named after him. He was president of the Entomological Society of Belgium from 1874 to 1876 and published two major works, Prémices entomolgiques and Monographie de Clivina et des genres voisins.
