= Brunneipennis =

Brunneipennis may refer to:

- Abagrotis brunneipennis, the Yankee dart, a moth of the family Noctuidae
- Amorphoscelis brunneipennis, species of praying mantis found in India and Sri Lanka
- Atheta brunneipennis, species of rove beetles native to Europe
- Clivina brunneipennis, species of ground beetle in the family Carabidae
- Coleophora brunneipennis, moth of the family Coleophoridae
- Crematogaster brunneipennis, species of ant in tribe Crematogastrini
- Glipa brunneipennis, species of beetle in the genus Glipa
- Haeterius brunneipennis, species in the family Histeridae ("clown beetles")
- Hypera brunneipennis, the Egyptian alfalfa weevil, species of true weevil in the beetle family Curculionidae
- Megalopyge brunneipennis, moth of the family Megalopygidae
- Metarctia brunneipennis, moth of the subfamily Arctiinae
- Nishada brunneipennis, moth of the family Erebidae
- Stenalia brunneipennis, beetle in the genus Stenalia of the family Mordellidae
- Trupanea brunneipennis, species of fruit fly in the family Tephritidae
- Vostox brunneipennis, species of earwig in the family Spongiphoridae
