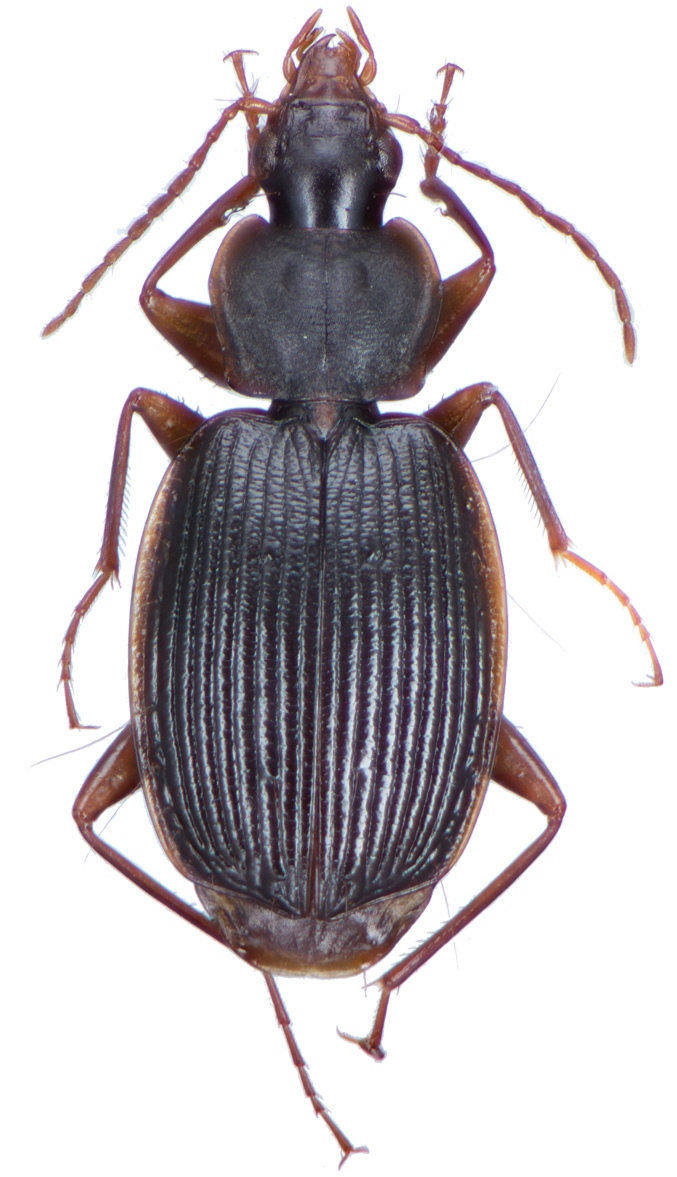

Scientific classification
- Kingdom: Animalia
- Phylum: Arthropoda
- Clade: Pancrustacea
- Class: Insecta
- Order: Coleoptera
- Suborder: Adephaga
- Family: Carabidae
- Genus: Amphimenes
- Species: A. asahinai

Binomial name
- Amphimenes asahinai Nakane, 1957

= Amphimenes asahinai =

Species of beetle

Amphimenes asahinai is a species of beetle in the family Carabidae (the ground beetles), and was first described in 1957 by Takehiko Nakane, from specimens collected in Taiwan.

It closely resembles Amphimenes piceolus (found in Japan) and has a body length of 6 to 7 mm.

It is endemic to Taiwan.
