= Petalopleura =

Petalopleura may refer to:

- A junior synonym of the moth genus Nishada
- Another name for Xandarellida, an extinct group of arthropods belonging to Artiopoda
