= Glipa afrirozui =

Scientific classification
- Kingdom: Animalia
- Phylum: Arthropoda
- Class: Insecta
- Order: Coleoptera
- Suborder: Polyphaga
- Infraorder: Cucujiformia
- Family: Mordellidae
- Genus: Glipa
- Species: G. afrirozui

Binomial name
- Glipa afrirozui Nakane, 1949

Species of beetle

Glipa afrirozui is a species of beetle in the genus Glipa. It was described in 1949, by Takehiko Nakane.
