= Glipa subsinuata =

Scientific classification
- Domain: Eukaryota
- Kingdom: Animalia
- Phylum: Arthropoda
- Class: Insecta
- Order: Coleoptera
- Suborder: Polyphaga
- Infraorder: Cucujiformia
- Family: Mordellidae
- Genus: Glipa
- Species: G. subsinuata

Binomial name
- Glipa subsinuata Píc, 1917

Species of beetle

Glipa subsinuata is a species of beetle in the genus Glipa. It was described in 1917. It is no longer an accepted taxon and is considered a synonym of Glipa subsinuatipennis.
