= Glipa fasciata =

Scientific classification
- Domain: Eukaryota
- Kingdom: Animalia
- Phylum: Arthropoda
- Class: Insecta
- Order: Coleoptera
- Suborder: Polyphaga
- Infraorder: Cucujiformia
- Family: Mordellidae
- Genus: Glipa
- Species: G. fasciata

Binomial name
- Glipa fasciata Kônô, 1928

Species of beetle

Glipa fasciata is a species of beetle in the genus Glipa.

The species was described by Kôno in 1928.
