= Glipa hieroglyphica =

Scientific classification
- Domain: Eukaryota
- Kingdom: Animalia
- Phylum: Arthropoda
- Class: Insecta
- Order: Coleoptera
- Suborder: Polyphaga
- Infraorder: Cucujiformia
- Family: Mordellidae
- Genus: Glipa
- Species: G. hieroglyphica

Binomial name
- Glipa hieroglyphica Schwarz, 1878

Species of beetle

Glipa hieroglyphica is a species of beetle in the genus Glipa. It was described in 1878.
