= Nishada chilomorpha =

Scientific classification
- Kingdom: Animalia
- Phylum: Arthropoda
- Class: Insecta
- Order: Lepidoptera
- Superfamily: Noctuoidea
- Family: Erebidae
- Subfamily: Arctiinae
- Genus: Nishada
- Species: N. chilomorpha

Binomial name
- Nishada chilomorpha (Snellen, 1877)

Synonyms
- Lithosia chilomorpha Snellen, 1877

Species of moth

Nishada chilomorpha is a moth of the family Erebidae first described by Snellen in 1877. It is found on Java and in Sundaland, the north-eastern Himalayas and Taiwan. The habitat consists of various lowland forest types, except heath forests. It is also found less frequently in lower montane forests.

The length of the forewings is 12–14 mm for males and 13–15 mm for females.

== Subspecies ==
- Nishada chilomorpha chilomorpha (Java)
- Nishada chilomorpha adunca Holloway, 2001 (Sundaland, north-eastern Himalayas, Taiwan)
