= Stenalia cechovskyi =

Scientific classification
- Domain: Eukaryota
- Kingdom: Animalia
- Phylum: Arthropoda
- Class: Insecta
- Order: Coleoptera
- Suborder: Polyphaga
- Infraorder: Cucujiformia
- Family: Mordellidae
- Genus: Stenalia
- Species: S. cechovskyi

Binomial name
- Stenalia cechovskyi Horák, 2006

Species of beetle

Stenalia cechovskyi is a beetle in the genus Stenalia of the family Mordellidae. It was described by Jan Horák in 2006 and is endemic to Malaysia where it was discovered in Cameron Highlands. The species is black in colour and have dark yellow elytron.
