= Stenalia testacea =

Scientific classification
- Kingdom: Animalia
- Phylum: Arthropoda
- Clade: Pancrustacea
- Class: Insecta
- Order: Coleoptera
- Suborder: Polyphaga
- Infraorder: Cucujiformia
- Family: Mordellidae
- Genus: Stenalia
- Species: S. testacea

Binomial name
- Stenalia testacea (Fabricius, 1787)

Synonyms
- Stenalia chivagra Dufour, 1843; Stenalia dolini Lazorko, 1974; Stenalia flavipennis Sturm, 1826; Stenalia luteicornis Schilsky, 1895; Stenalia meridionalis Chobaut, 1924; Mordella chiragra Dufour, 1843; Mordella flavipennis Sturm, 1826; Mordella testacea Fabricius, 1787

Species of beetle

Stenalia testacea is a species of tumbling flower beetles in the family Mordellidae.
