= Nishada tula =

Scientific classification
- Domain: Eukaryota
- Kingdom: Animalia
- Phylum: Arthropoda
- Class: Insecta
- Order: Lepidoptera
- Superfamily: Noctuoidea
- Family: Erebidae
- Subfamily: Arctiinae
- Genus: Nishada
- Species: N. tula

Binomial name
- Nishada tula C. Swinhoe, 1900

Species of moth

Nishada tula is a moth of the family Erebidae first described by Charles Swinhoe in 1900. It is found on the Sula Islands in Indonesia.
