= Stenalia iranica =

Scientific classification
- Domain: Eukaryota
- Kingdom: Animalia
- Phylum: Arthropoda
- Class: Insecta
- Order: Coleoptera
- Suborder: Polyphaga
- Infraorder: Cucujiformia
- Family: Mordellidae
- Genus: Stenalia
- Species: S. iranica

Binomial name
- Stenalia iranica Horák, 1981

Species of beetle

Stenalia iranica is a beetle in the genus Stenalia of the family Mordellidae. It was described in 1981 by Horák.
