= Stenalia dzhulfae =

Scientific classification
- Domain: Eukaryota
- Kingdom: Animalia
- Phylum: Arthropoda
- Class: Insecta
- Order: Coleoptera
- Suborder: Polyphaga
- Infraorder: Cucujiformia
- Family: Mordellidae
- Genus: Stenalia
- Species: S. dzhulfae

Binomial name
- Stenalia dzhulfae Odnosum, 2001

Species of beetle

Stenalia dzhulfae is a beetle in the genus Stenalia of the family Mordellidae. It is found only in Azerbaijan. It was described in 2001 by Odnosum.
