= Nishada rotundipennis =

Scientific classification
- Kingdom: Animalia
- Phylum: Arthropoda
- Class: Insecta
- Order: Lepidoptera
- Superfamily: Noctuoidea
- Family: Erebidae
- Subfamily: Arctiinae
- Genus: Nishada
- Species: N. rotundipennis

Binomial name
- Nishada rotundipennis (Walker, 1862)

Synonyms
- Lithosia rotundipennis Walker, 1862; Lithosia nodicornis Walker, 1862

Species of moth

Nishada rotundipennis is a moth of the family Erebidae first described by Francis Walker in 1862. It is found on Borneo and Peninsular Malaysia and in Myanmar and the north-eastern Himalayas. The habitat consists of forests.
