= Nishada xantholoma =

Scientific classification
- Kingdom: Animalia
- Phylum: Arthropoda
- Class: Insecta
- Order: Lepidoptera
- Superfamily: Noctuoidea
- Family: Erebidae
- Subfamily: Arctiinae
- Genus: Nishada
- Species: N. xantholoma

Binomial name
- Nishada xantholoma (Snellen, 1879)

Synonyms
- Lithosia xantholoma Snellen, 1879

Species of moth

Nishada xantholoma is a moth of the family Erebidae first described by Snellen in 1879. It is found on Sulawesi in Indonesia.
