= Stenalia jakli =

Scientific classification
- Kingdom: Animalia
- Phylum: Arthropoda
- Class: Insecta
- Order: Coleoptera
- Suborder: Polyphaga
- Infraorder: Cucujiformia
- Family: Mordellidae
- Genus: Stenalia
- Species: S. jakli

Binomial name
- Stenalia jakli Horák, 2006

Species of beetle

Stenalia jakli is a beetle in the genus Stenalia of the family Mordellidae. It was described in 2006 by Horák on Sumba island in Indonesia. The species' metatibia and elytron are black in colour. The name derived from Stanislav Jákl, an entomologist who worked with Horák.
