= Haeterius exiguus =

Scientific classification
- Kingdom: Animalia
- Phylum: Arthropoda
- Class: Insecta
- Order: Coleoptera
- Suborder: Polyphaga
- Infraorder: Staphyliniformia
- Family: Histeridae
- Genus: Haeterius
- Species: H. exiguus

Binomial name
- Haeterius exiguus Mann, 1911

Species of beetle

Haeterius exiguus is a species of clown beetle in the family Histeridae. It is found in North America.
