= Haeterius blanchardi =

Scientific classification
- Kingdom: Animalia
- Phylum: Arthropoda
- Clade: Pancrustacea
- Class: Insecta
- Order: Coleoptera
- Suborder: Polyphaga
- Infraorder: Staphyliniformia
- Family: Histeridae
- Genus: Haeterius
- Species: H. blanchardi

Binomial name
- Haeterius blanchardi J. L. LeConte, 1878

Species of beetle

Haeterius blanchardi is a species of clown beetle in the family Histeridae. These beetles are native to the United States, and have been found in Wisconsin, Massachusetts, and New Jersey.

Haeterius blanchardi is a Myrmecophily species, living in colonies of the ant species Formica pallidefulva. The larvae remain undescribed, but likely develop in the nests of the host ants.
