= Nishada sambara =

Scientific classification
- Domain: Eukaryota
- Kingdom: Animalia
- Phylum: Arthropoda
- Class: Insecta
- Order: Lepidoptera
- Superfamily: Noctuoidea
- Family: Erebidae
- Subfamily: Arctiinae
- Genus: Nishada
- Species: N. sambara

Binomial name
- Nishada sambara (Moore, 1859)

Synonyms
- Lithosia sambara Moore, 1859; Lithosia intacta Walker, 1862; Lithosia chryseola Snellen, 1879; Nishada flavens Rothschild, 1912

Species of moth

Nishada sambara is a moth of the family Erebidae first described by Frederic Moore in 1859. It is found on Sumatra, Borneo, Java, the Sangihe Islands, Bali and the Philippines. The habitat consists of lowland forests.
