= Glipa quadrifasciata =

Scientific classification
- Domain: Eukaryota
- Kingdom: Animalia
- Phylum: Arthropoda
- Class: Insecta
- Order: Coleoptera
- Suborder: Polyphaga
- Infraorder: Cucujiformia
- Family: Mordellidae
- Genus: Glipa
- Species: G. quadrifasciata

Binomial name
- Glipa quadrifasciata Chevrolat, 1882

Species of beetle

Glipa quadrifasciata is a species of beetle in the genus Glipa and was first described in 1882.
