= Nishada aureocincta =

Scientific classification
- Domain: Eukaryota
- Kingdom: Animalia
- Phylum: Arthropoda
- Class: Insecta
- Order: Lepidoptera
- Superfamily: Noctuoidea
- Family: Erebidae
- Subfamily: Arctiinae
- Genus: Nishada
- Species: N. aureocincta

Binomial name
- Nishada aureocincta Debauche, 1938

Species of moth

Nishada aureocincta is a moth of the family Erebidae. It was described by Hubert Robert Debauche in 1938. It is found on Sulawesi.
