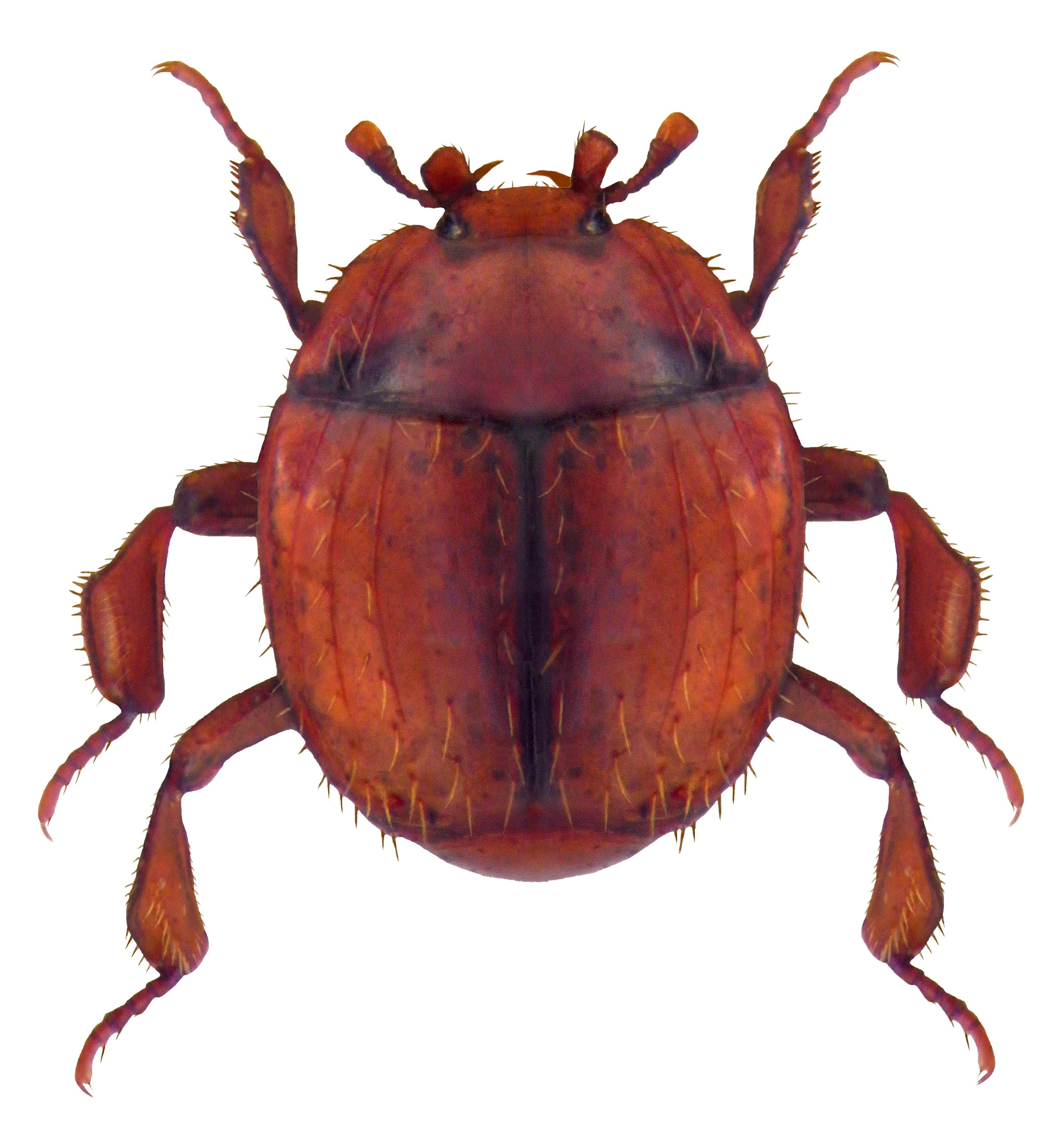
- Haeterius ferrugineus

Scientific classification
- Kingdom: Animalia
- Phylum: Arthropoda
- Class: Insecta
- Order: Coleoptera
- Suborder: Polyphaga
- Infraorder: Staphyliniformia
- Family: Histeridae
- Subfamily: Haeteriinae
- Genus: Haeterius; Dejean, 1833

Synonyms
- Hetaerius Erichson, 1834

= Haeterius =

Genus of beetles

Haeterius is a genus of clown beetles in the family Histeridae. There are at least 20 described species in Haeterius.

== Species ==
- Haeterius blanchardi J. L. LeConte, 1878
- Haeterius brunneipennis (Randall, 1838)
- Haeterius californicus Horn, 1870
- Haeterius dietrichi Martin, 1922
- Haeterius exiguus Mann, 1911
- Haeterius ferrugineus (Olivier, 1789)
- Haeterius flavohirtus Krása, 1941
- Haeterius gratus Lewis, 1884
- Haeterius helenae Mann, 1914
- Haeterius hirsutus Martin, 1920
- Haeterius hubbardi Mann, 1924
- Haeterius minimus Fall, 1907
- Haeterius morsus J. L. LeConte, 1859
- Haeterius nudus Martin, 1922
- Haeterius optatus Lewis, 1884
- Haeterius ottomanus Mazur, 1981
- Haeterius pilosus Martin, 1922
- Haeterius plicicollis Fairmaire, 1876
- Haeterius schwarzi Mann, 1924
- Haeterius setosus Martin, 1922
- Haeterius strenuus Fall, 1917
- Haeterius tristriatus Horn, 1874
- Haeterius vandykei Martin, 1922
- Haeterius wagneri Ross, 1938
- Haeterius wheeleri Mann, 1911
- Haeterius williamsi Martin, 1920
- Haeterius zelus Fall, 1917
