= Nishada marginalis =

Scientific classification
- Domain: Eukaryota
- Kingdom: Animalia
- Phylum: Arthropoda
- Class: Insecta
- Order: Lepidoptera
- Superfamily: Noctuoidea
- Family: Erebidae
- Subfamily: Arctiinae
- Genus: Nishada
- Species: N. marginalis

Binomial name
- Nishada marginalis (Felder, 1875)

Synonyms
- Cyrtochila marginalis Felder, 1875

Species of moth

Nishada marginalis is a moth of the family Erebidae first described by Felder in 1875. It is found on Sulawesi in Indonesia.
