= Glipa flava =

Scientific classification
- Domain: Eukaryota
- Kingdom: Animalia
- Phylum: Arthropoda
- Class: Insecta
- Order: Coleoptera
- Suborder: Polyphaga
- Infraorder: Cucujiformia
- Family: Mordellidae
- Genus: Glipa
- Species: G. flava

Binomial name
- Glipa flava Fan & Yang, 1993

Species of beetle

Glipa flava is a species of beetle in the genus Glipa. It was described by Fan and Yang in 1993.
