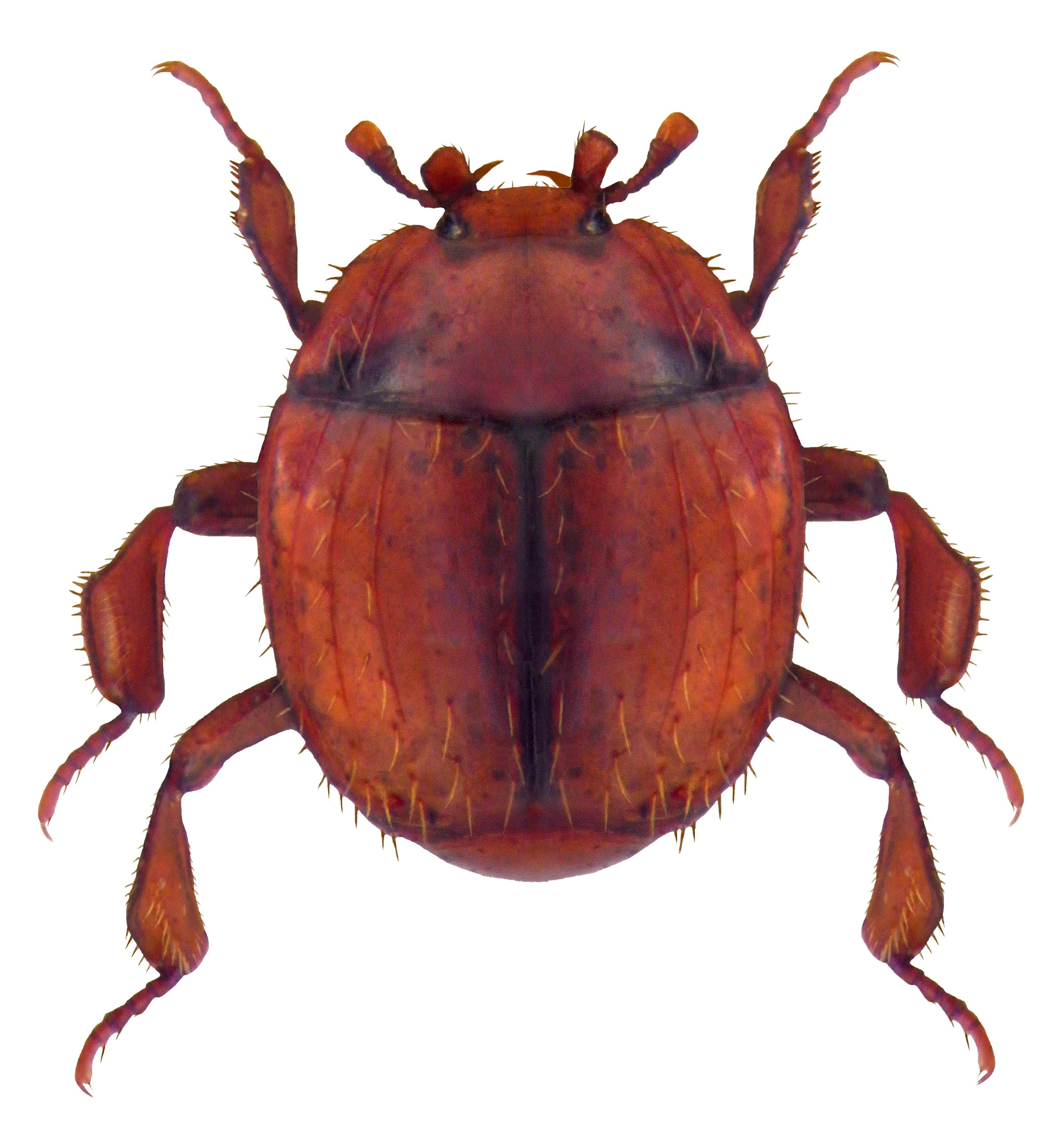
- Haeterius ferrugineus

Scientific classification
- Kingdom: Animalia
- Phylum: Arthropoda
- Clade: Pancrustacea
- Class: Insecta
- Order: Coleoptera
- Suborder: Polyphaga
- Infraorder: Staphyliniformia
- Family: Histeridae
- Genus: Haeterius
- Species: H. ferrugineus

Binomial name
- Haeterius ferrugineus (Olivier, 1789)

= Haeterius ferrugineus =

Species of beetle

Haeterius ferrugineus is a beetle belonging to the Histeridae family.
