= Glipa watanabeorum =

Scientific classification
- Domain: Eukaryota
- Kingdom: Animalia
- Phylum: Arthropoda
- Class: Insecta
- Order: Coleoptera
- Suborder: Polyphaga
- Infraorder: Cucujiformia
- Family: Mordellidae
- Genus: Glipa
- Species: G. watanabeorum

Binomial name
- Glipa watanabeorum Takakuwa, 2002

Species of beetle

Glipa watanabeorum is a species of beetle in the genus Glipa. It was described in 2002.
