= Nishada syntomioides =

Scientific classification
- Kingdom: Animalia
- Phylum: Arthropoda
- Class: Insecta
- Order: Lepidoptera
- Superfamily: Noctuoidea
- Family: Erebidae
- Subfamily: Arctiinae
- Genus: Nishada
- Species: N. syntomioides

Binomial name
- Nishada syntomioides (Walker, 1862)

Synonyms
- Lithosia syntomioides Walker, 1862; Eutane brevis Swinhoe, 1892

Species of moth

Nishada syntomioides is a moth of the family Erebidae first described by Francis Walker in 1862. It is found on Borneo. The habitat consists of lowland forests.
