= Haeterius wagneri =

Scientific classification
- Kingdom: Animalia
- Phylum: Arthropoda
- Class: Insecta
- Order: Coleoptera
- Suborder: Polyphaga
- Infraorder: Staphyliniformia
- Family: Histeridae
- Genus: Haeterius
- Species: H. wagneri

Binomial name
- Haeterius wagneri Ross, 1938

Species of beetle

Haeterius wagneri is a species of clown beetle in the family Histeridae. It is found in North America.
