= Glipa curtopyga =

Scientific classification
- Domain: Eukaryota
- Kingdom: Animalia
- Phylum: Arthropoda
- Class: Insecta
- Order: Coleoptera
- Suborder: Polyphaga
- Infraorder: Cucujiformia
- Family: Mordellidae
- Genus: Glipa
- Species: G. curtopyga

Binomial name
- Glipa curtopyga Fan & Yang, 1993

Species of beetle

Glipa curtopyga is a species of beetle in the genus Glipa. It was described in 1993.
