= Stenalia pacholatkoi =

Scientific classification
- Kingdom: Animalia
- Phylum: Arthropoda
- Clade: Pancrustacea
- Class: Insecta
- Order: Coleoptera
- Suborder: Polyphaga
- Infraorder: Cucujiformia
- Family: Mordellidae
- Genus: Stenalia
- Species: S. pacholatkoi

Binomial name
- Stenalia pacholatkoi Horák, 1995

Species of beetle

Stenalia pacholatkoi is a beetle in the genus Stenalia of the family Mordellidae. It was described in 1995 by Horák.
