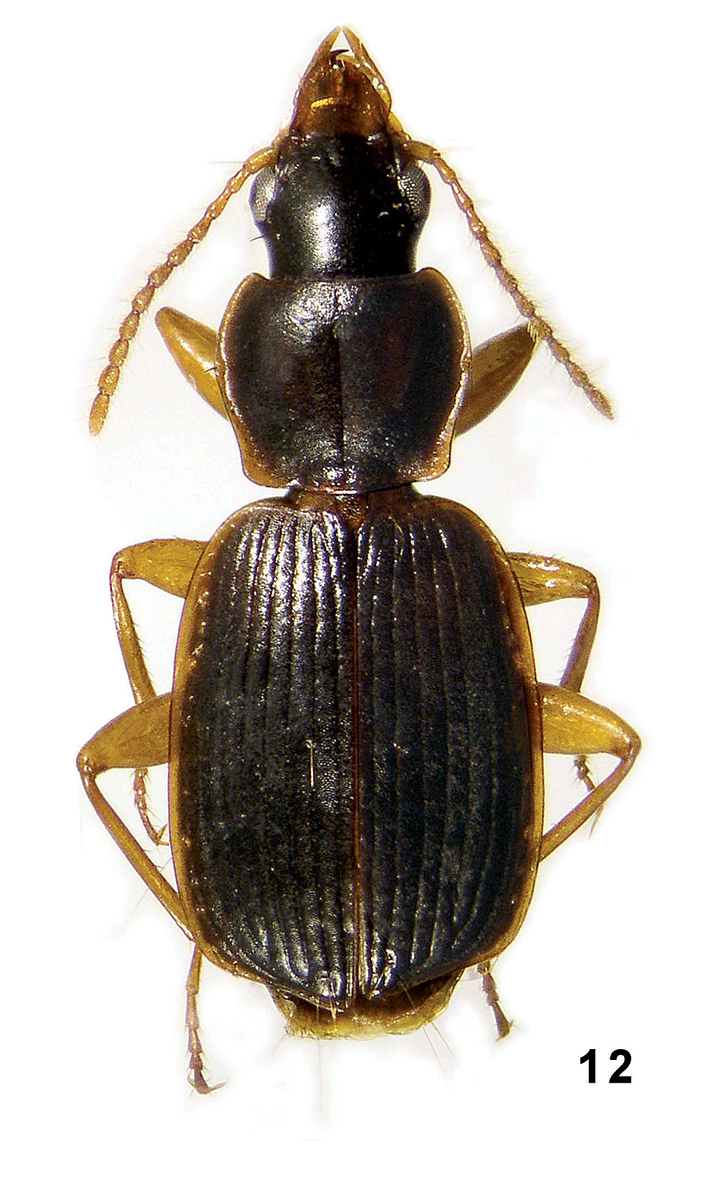
- Amphimenes rufipes

Scientific classification
- Domain: Eukaryota
- Kingdom: Animalia
- Phylum: Arthropoda
- Class: Insecta
- Order: Coleoptera
- Suborder: Adephaga
- Family: Carabidae
- Subfamily: Lebiinae
- Tribe: Lebiini
- Genus: Amphimenes; Bates, 1873

Subgenera
- Amblops Andrewes, 1931; Amphimenes Bates, 1873; Amphinemes Fedorenko, 2019

Synonyms
- Pseudosinurus; Pseudosinurus brunneus Kirschenhofer, 1999

= Amphimenes =

Genus of beetles

Amphimenes is a genus of beetles in the family Carabidae, the ground beetles. They are native to Asia from Burma to Japan to Vietnam.

These are small to medium-sized beetles. They have small to large eyes and short to long antennae. The bodies are totally or mostly hairless. Some are wingless. They are a solid color or may have light spots on the iridescent elytra. Their coloration is mostly dark but the legs are usually lighter, sometimes yellow to red in color.

These beetles live in forests. They can be found in lowlands or in mountains. Species that live in trees have wings; those that live mostly on the ground are often wingless.

== Species ==
Amphimenes contains the following 33 species:

- Amphimenes absensacidus Hunting & Yang, 2019
- Amphimenes acutipennis Fedorenko, 2019
- Amphimenes asahinai Nakane, 1957
- Amphimenes basipunctatus Fedorenko, 2019
- Amphimenes beichatiensis Hunting & Yang, 2019
- Amphimenes bicoloripes Fedorenko, 2019
- Amphimenes bidoupensis Fedorenko, 2010
- Amphimenes brunneus (Kirschenhofer, 1999)
- Amphimenes femoralis Fedorenko, 2019
- Amphimenes giganteus Fedorenko, 2010
- Amphimenes gracilis Fedorenko, 2010
- Amphimenes guttatus Fedorenko, 2014
- Amphimenes kabakovi Fedorenko, 2010
- Amphimenes konplongensis Fedorenko, 2019
- Amphimenes maculatus Fedorenko, 2010
- Amphimenes marginicollis Fedorenko, 2019
- Amphimenes medius Fedorenko, 2010
- Amphimenes micros Fedorenko, 2014
- Amphimenes minutus Fedorenko, 2010
- Amphimenes montanus Fedorenko, 2010
- Amphimenes nitidus Fedorenko, 2010
- Amphimenes piceolus Bates, 1873
- Amphimenes piceus Andrewes, 1931
- Amphimenes planicollis Fedorenko, 2010
- Amphimenes planipennis Fedorenko, 2014
- Amphimenes reflexicollis Fedorenko, 2010
- Amphimenes ruficollis Fedorenko, 2019
- Amphimenes rufipes Fedorenko, 2010
- Amphimenes rugulipennis (Bates, 1892)
- Amphimenes ryukyuensis Habu, 1964
- Amphimenes similis Fedorenko, 2019
- Amphimenes subcostatus Fedorenko, 2019
- Amphimenes tonkinensis Fedorenko, 2019
- Amphimenes wooshini Choi & Park, 2020
