= Glipa ornata =

Scientific classification
- Kingdom: Animalia
- Phylum: Arthropoda
- Class: Insecta
- Order: Coleoptera
- Suborder: Polyphaga
- Infraorder: Cucujiformia
- Family: Mordellidae
- Genus: Glipa
- Species: G. ornata

Binomial name
- Glipa ornata Fairmaire, 1895

Species of beetle

Glipa ornata is a species of beetle in the genus Glipa. It was described in 1895.
