= Stenalia escherichi =

Scientific classification
- Kingdom: Animalia
- Phylum: Arthropoda
- Class: Insecta
- Order: Coleoptera
- Suborder: Polyphaga
- Infraorder: Cucujiformia
- Family: Mordellidae
- Genus: Stenalia
- Species: S. escherichi

Binomial name
- Stenalia escherichi Schilsky, 1898

Synonyms
- Mordellistena singularis Reitter, 1911; Mordellistena uralensis Csiki, 1915; Stenalia singularis Reitter, 1911; Stenalia uralensis Csiki, 1915

Species of beetle

Stenalia escherichi is a species of tumbling flower beetle in the family Mordellidae.
