= Nishada aurantiaca =

Scientific classification
- Domain: Eukaryota
- Kingdom: Animalia
- Phylum: Arthropoda
- Class: Insecta
- Order: Lepidoptera
- Superfamily: Noctuoidea
- Family: Erebidae
- Subfamily: Arctiinae
- Genus: Nishada
- Species: N. aurantiaca

Binomial name
- Nishada aurantiaca Rothschild, 1913

Species of moth

Nishada aurantiaca is a moth of the family Erebidae first described by Walter Rothschild in 1913. It is found on Sulawesi.
