= Glipa longipennis =

Scientific classification
- Kingdom: Animalia
- Phylum: Arthropoda
- Class: Insecta
- Order: Coleoptera
- Suborder: Polyphaga
- Infraorder: Cucujiformia
- Family: Mordellidae
- Genus: Glipa
- Species: G. longipennis

Binomial name
- Glipa longipennis Fairmaire, 1905

Species of beetle

Glipa longipennis is a species of beetle in the genus Glipa. It was described in 1905.
