= Stenalia gridelli =

Scientific classification
- Domain: Eukaryota
- Kingdom: Animalia
- Phylum: Arthropoda
- Class: Insecta
- Order: Coleoptera
- Suborder: Polyphaga
- Infraorder: Cucujiformia
- Family: Mordellidae
- Genus: Stenalia
- Species: S. gridelli

Binomial name
- Stenalia gridelli Franciscolo, 1949

Species of beetle

Stenalia gridelli is a beetle in the genus Stenalia of the family Mordellidae. It was described in 1949 by Franciscolo.
