= Nishada benjaminea =

Scientific classification
- Domain: Eukaryota
- Kingdom: Animalia
- Phylum: Arthropoda
- Class: Insecta
- Order: Lepidoptera
- Superfamily: Noctuoidea
- Family: Erebidae
- Subfamily: Arctiinae
- Genus: Nishada
- Species: N. benjaminea

Binomial name
- Nishada benjaminea Roepke, 1946

Species of moth

Nishada benjaminea is a moth of the family Erebidae. It was described by Walter Karl Johann Roepke in 1946. It is found on Sulawesi.
