= Nishada impervia =

Scientific classification
- Kingdom: Animalia
- Phylum: Arthropoda
- Class: Insecta
- Order: Lepidoptera
- Superfamily: Noctuoidea
- Family: Erebidae
- Subfamily: Arctiinae
- Genus: Nishada
- Species: N. impervia

Binomial name
- Nishada impervia (Walker, 1864)

Synonyms
- Lithosia impervia Walker, 1864; Petalopleura phaeocephala Meyrick, 1889; Nishada melanopa Bethune-Baker, 1904; Ilema unicolora Bethune-Baker, 1904

Species of moth

Nishada impervia is a moth of the family Erebidae first described by Francis Walker in 1864. It is found in New Guinea, Papua New Guinea and on Seram. The habitat consists of lowland areas.
