= Nishada melanistis =

Scientific classification
- Domain: Eukaryota
- Kingdom: Animalia
- Phylum: Arthropoda
- Class: Insecta
- Order: Lepidoptera
- Superfamily: Noctuoidea
- Family: Erebidae
- Subfamily: Arctiinae
- Genus: Nishada
- Species: N. melanistis

Binomial name
- Nishada melanistis C. Swinhoe, 1902

Species of moth

Nishada melanistis is a moth of the family Erebidae first described by Charles Swinhoe in 1902. It is found on Borneo and Sulawesi.
