= Glipa nigronotata =

Scientific classification
- Domain: Eukaryota
- Kingdom: Animalia
- Phylum: Arthropoda
- Class: Insecta
- Order: Coleoptera
- Suborder: Polyphaga
- Infraorder: Cucujiformia
- Family: Mordellidae
- Genus: Glipa
- Species: G. nigronotata

Binomial name
- Glipa nigronotata Píc, 1941

Species of beetle

Glipa nigronotata is a species of beetle in the genus Glipa. It was described in 1941.
