= Stenalia lindbergi =

Scientific classification
- Domain: Eukaryota
- Kingdom: Animalia
- Phylum: Arthropoda
- Class: Insecta
- Order: Coleoptera
- Suborder: Polyphaga
- Infraorder: Cucujiformia
- Family: Mordellidae
- Genus: Stenalia
- Species: S. lindbergi

Binomial name
- Stenalia lindbergi Ermisch, 1963

Species of beetle

Stenalia lindbergi is a beetle in the genus Stenalia of the family Mordellidae. It was described in 1963 by Ermisch.
