= Stenalia jendeki =

Scientific classification
- Domain: Eukaryota
- Kingdom: Animalia
- Phylum: Arthropoda
- Class: Insecta
- Order: Coleoptera
- Suborder: Polyphaga
- Infraorder: Cucujiformia
- Family: Mordellidae
- Genus: Stenalia
- Species: S. jendeki

Binomial name
- Stenalia jendeki Horák, 2006

Species of beetle

Stenalia jendeki is a beetle in the genus Stenalia of the family Mordellidae. It was described in 2006 by Horák and is endemic to Cambodia. The species is black coloured and is 4.8–7.3 millimetres (0.19–0.29 in) long. The species is named after Eduard Jendek, an entomologist with whom Horák worked.
