= Nishada schintlmeisteri =

Scientific classification
- Kingdom: Animalia
- Phylum: Arthropoda
- Clade: Pancrustacea
- Class: Insecta
- Order: Lepidoptera
- Superfamily: Noctuoidea
- Family: Erebidae
- Subfamily: Arctiinae
- Genus: Nishada
- Species: N. schintlmeisteri

Binomial name
- Nishada schintlmeisteri Dubatolov & Bucsek, 2013

Species of moth

Nishada schintlmeisteri is a moth of the family Erebidae. It is found on Sumatra.
