= Nishada flabrifera =

Scientific classification
- Domain: Eukaryota
- Kingdom: Animalia
- Phylum: Arthropoda
- Class: Insecta
- Order: Lepidoptera
- Superfamily: Noctuoidea
- Family: Erebidae
- Subfamily: Arctiinae
- Genus: Nishada
- Species: N. flabrifera

Binomial name
- Nishada flabrifera Moore, 1878

Species of moth

Nishada flabrifera is a moth of the family Erebidae. It is found in Sri Lanka, India (Calcutta, Travancore, Nilgiris) and on Java.

== Description ==
Its wingspan is about 30 mm. Male with the basal half of antennae not thickened. Forewings with vein 3 and 4 from cell. vein 6 from below angle and vein 10 absent. Hindwings with vein 6 absent. In male, head smoky black, and thorax yellowish brown. Abdomen ochreous, where the second segment is almost scaleless and shoring dark cuticle. Forewing uniformly yellowish brown. Hindwings are ochreous.
