= Stenalia oligocenica =

Scientific classification
- Domain: Eukaryota
- Kingdom: Animalia
- Phylum: Arthropoda
- Class: Insecta
- Order: Coleoptera
- Suborder: Polyphaga
- Infraorder: Cucujiformia
- Family: Mordellidae
- Genus: Stenalia
- Species: S. oligocenica

Binomial name
- Stenalia oligocenica Nel, 1985

Species of beetle

Stenalia oligocenica is a beetle in the genus Stenalia of the family Mordellidae. It was described in 1985 by Nel.
