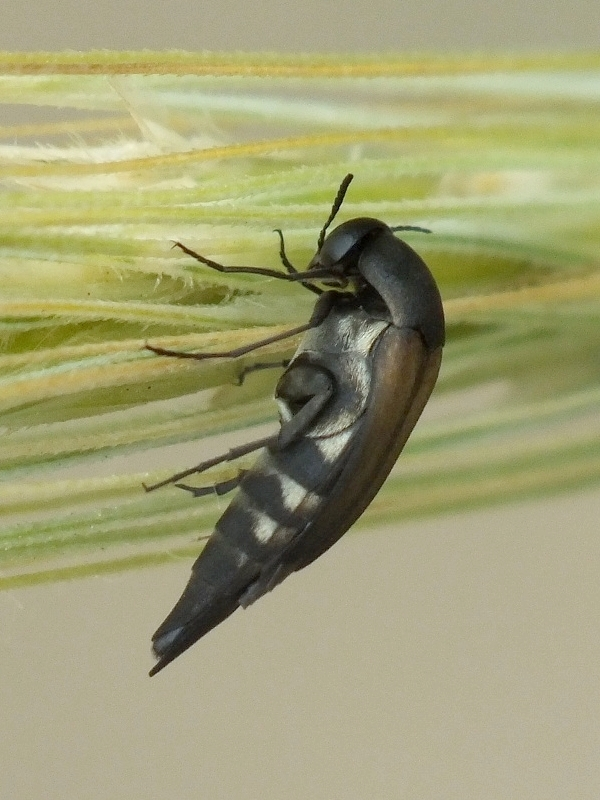
- Stenalia araxicola, Russia

Scientific classification
- Domain: Eukaryota
- Kingdom: Animalia
- Phylum: Arthropoda
- Class: Insecta
- Order: Coleoptera
- Suborder: Polyphaga
- Infraorder: Cucujiformia
- Family: Mordellidae
- Tribe: Stenaliini
- Genus: Stenalia; Mulsant, 1856

= Stenalia =

Genus of beetles

Stenalia is a genus of tumbling flower beetles in the family Mordellidae. There are more than 25 described species in Stenalia, found in Southern Europe, Asia, and Africa.

== Species ==
These 28 species belong to the genus Stenalia:

- Stenalia araxicola Iablokoff-Khnzorian, 1957
- Stenalia ascaniaenovae Lazorko, 1974
- Stenalia balcanica Franciscolo, 1949
- Stenalia bilyi Horák, 1978
- Stenalia bisecta Baudi de Selve, 1883
- Stenalia brunneipennis Mulsant, 1856
- Stenalia cechovskyi Horák, 2006
- Stenalia dembickyana Horák, 1995
- Stenalia dzhulfae Odnosum, 2001
- Stenalia ermolenkoi Odnosum, 2000
- Stenalia escherichi Schilsky, 1898
- Stenalia gracilicornis Baudi de Selve, 1878
- Stenalia graeca Ermisch, 1965
- Stenalia gridelli Franciscolo, 1949
- Stenalia hispana Schilsky, 1895
- Stenalia indica Horák, 1995
- Stenalia iranica Horak, 1981
- Stenalia jakli Horák, 2006
- Stenalia jendeki Horák, 2006
- Stenalia lindbergi Ermisch, 1963
- Stenalia merkli Schilsky, 1895
- Stenalia oligocenica Nel, 1985
- Stenalia pacholatkoi Horák, 1995
- Stenalia siamensis Horák, 1995
- Stenalia stipae Chobaut, 1924
- Stenalia testacea (Fabricius, 1787)
- Stenalia tonkinea Horák, 1995
- Stenalia vladimiri Odnosum, 2001

A number of additional Stenalia species, some of which are no longer valid, are listed in "Mordellidae Species List at Joel Hallan's Biology Catalog".
