= Stenalia ermolenkoi =

Scientific classification
- Domain: Eukaryota
- Kingdom: Animalia
- Phylum: Arthropoda
- Class: Insecta
- Order: Coleoptera
- Suborder: Polyphaga
- Infraorder: Cucujiformia
- Family: Mordellidae
- Genus: Stenalia
- Species: S. ermolenkoi

Binomial name
- Stenalia ermolenkoi Odnosum, 2000

Species of beetle

Stenalia ermolenkoi is a beetle in the genus Stenalia of the family Mordellidae. It is found only in Azerbaijan. It was described in 2000 by Odnosum.
