= Glipa sauteri =

Scientific classification
- Domain: Eukaryota
- Kingdom: Animalia
- Phylum: Arthropoda
- Class: Insecta
- Order: Coleoptera
- Suborder: Polyphaga
- Infraorder: Cucujiformia
- Family: Mordellidae
- Genus: Glipa
- Species: G. sauteri

Binomial name
- Glipa sauteri Píc, 1911

Species of beetle

Glipa sauteri is a species of beetle in the genus Glipa. It was described in 1911.
