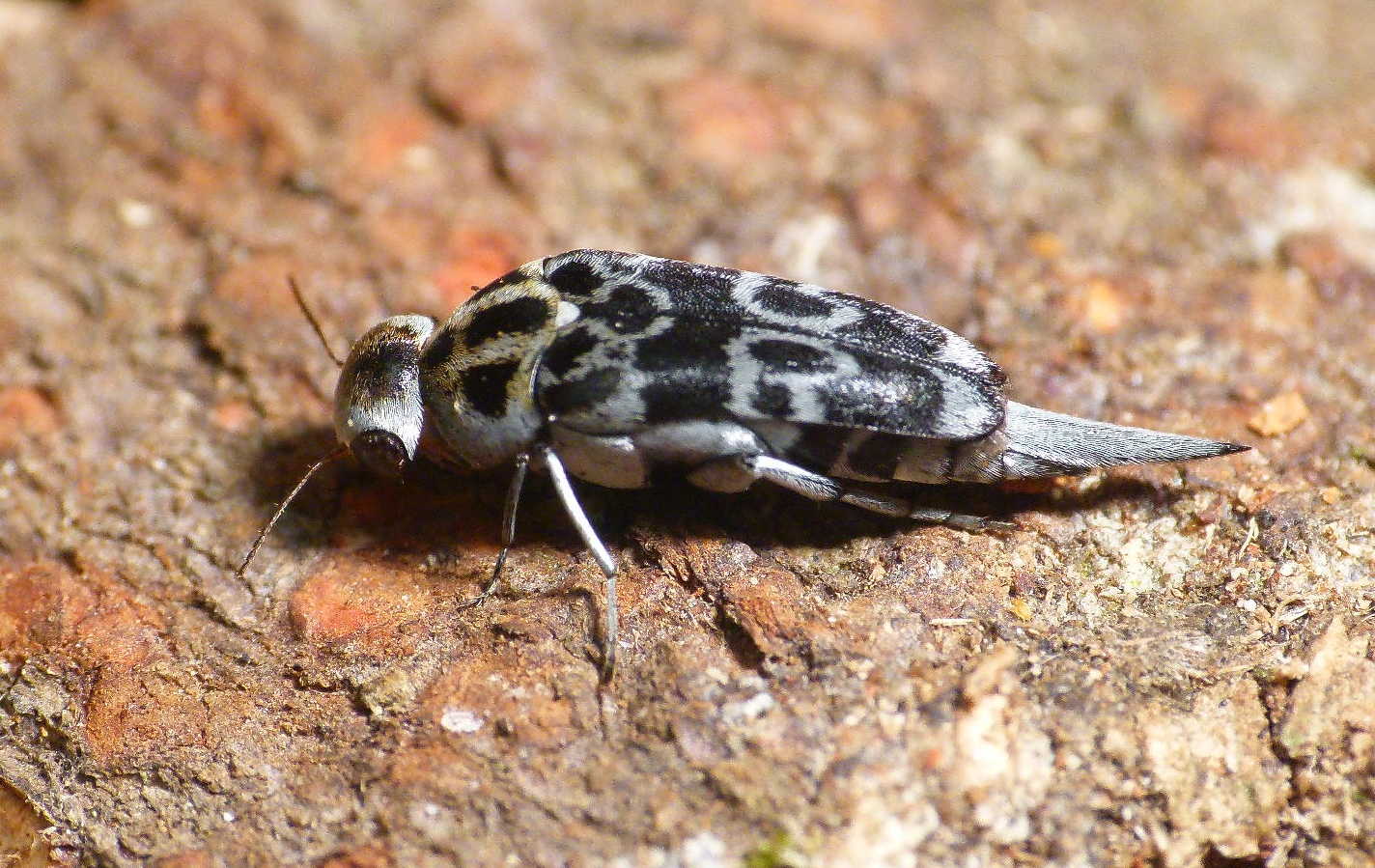
- Glipa, from India

Scientific classification
- Kingdom: Animalia
- Phylum: Arthropoda
- Class: Insecta
- Order: Coleoptera
- Suborder: Polyphaga
- Infraorder: Cucujiformia
- Family: Mordellidae
- Subfamily: Mordellinae
- Tribe: Mordellini
- Genus: Glipa; LeConte, 1859

Type species
- Mordella hilaris Say, 1835

Synonyms
- Macroglipa Franciscolo, 1952; Neoglipa Franciscolo, 1952; Stenoglipa Franciscolo, 1952

= Glipa =

Genus of beetles

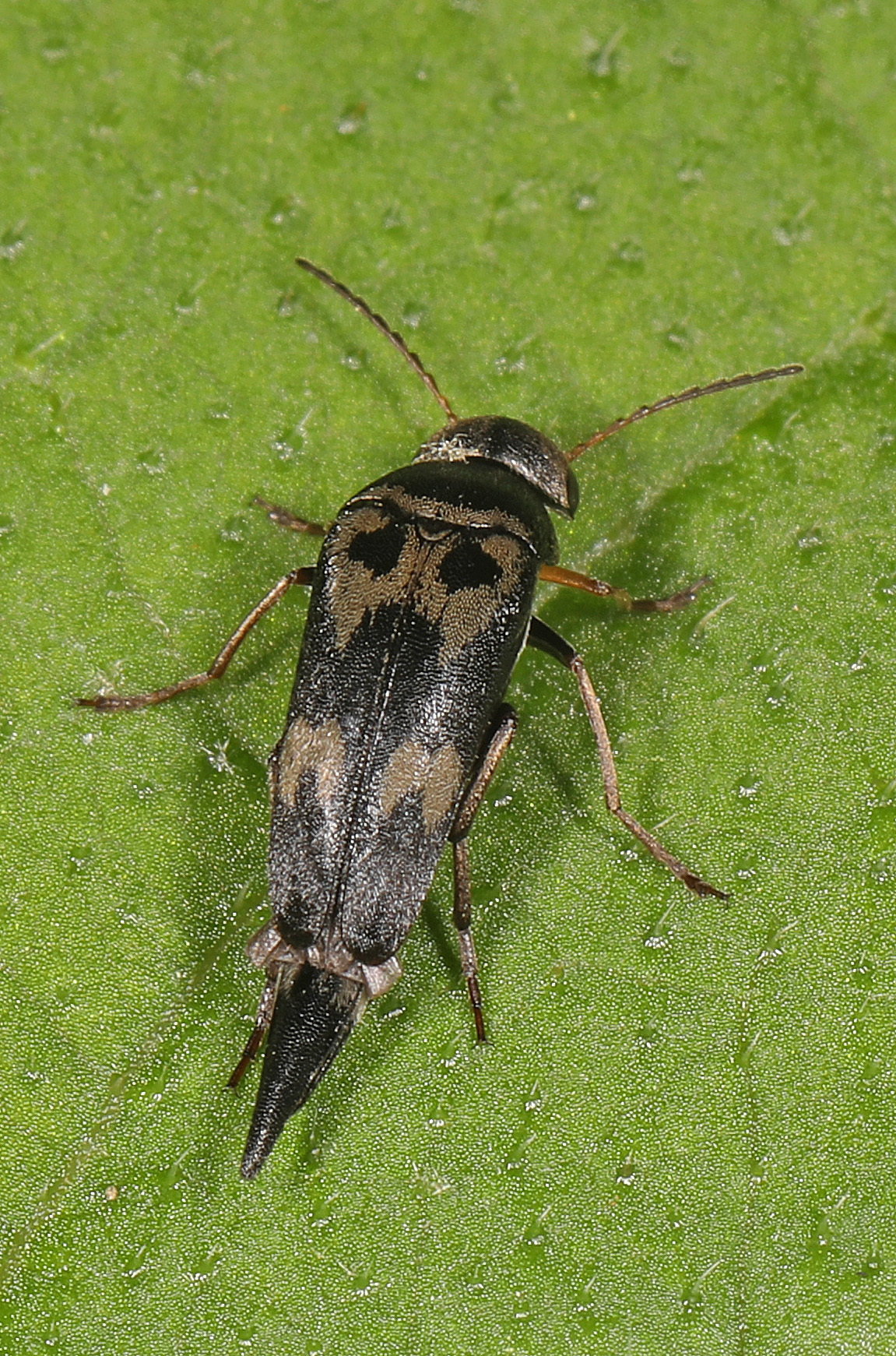
Glipa oculata, Virginia

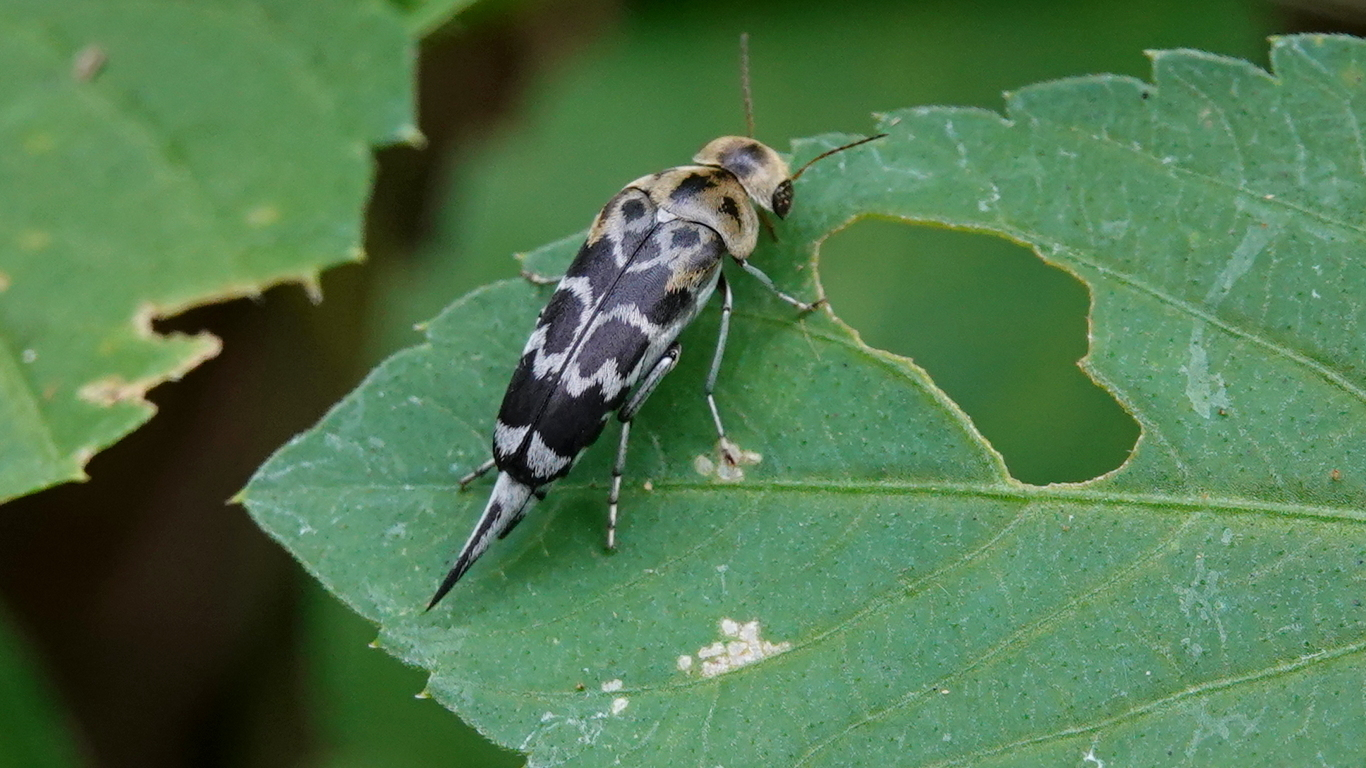
Glipa malaccana, Taiwan

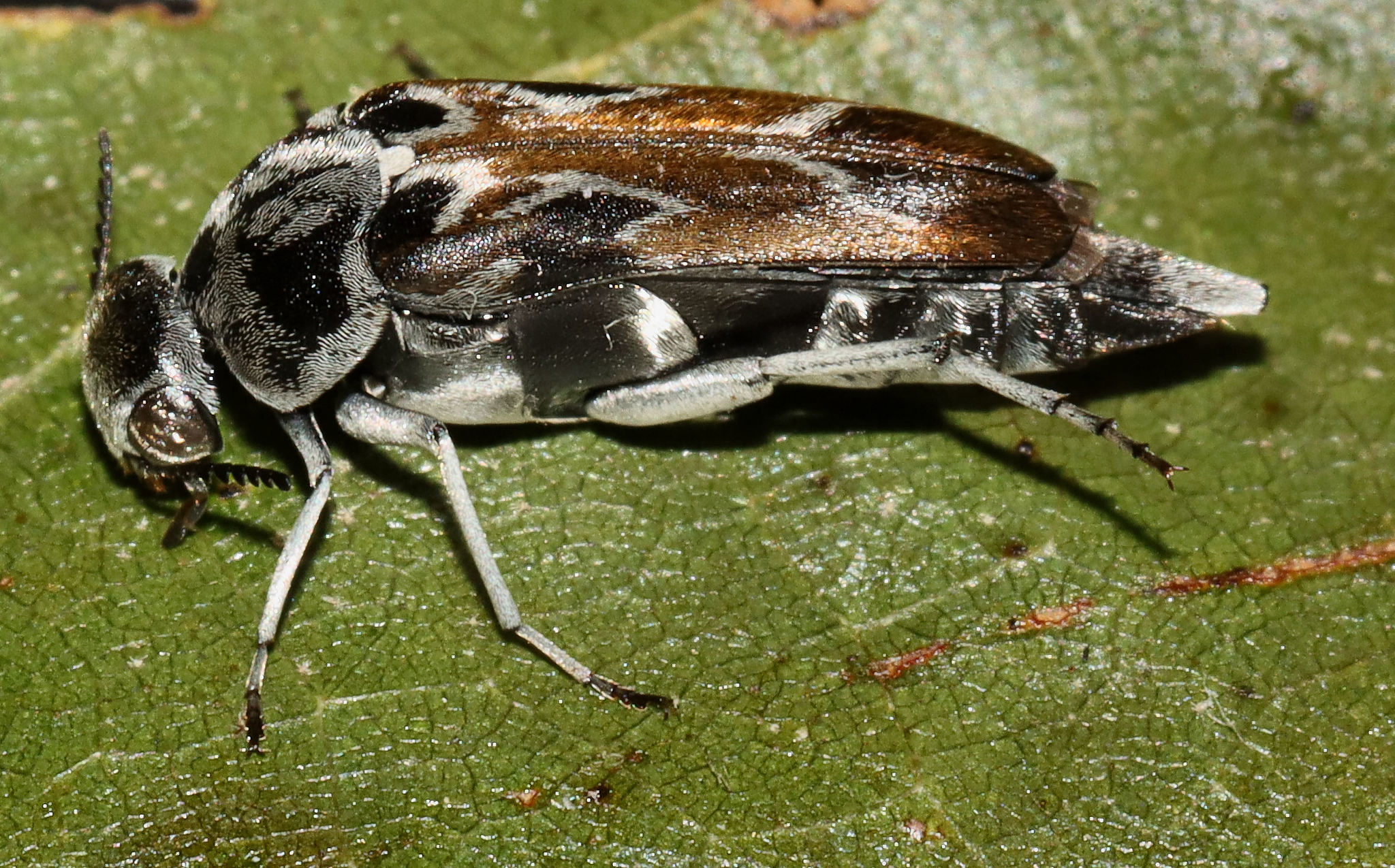
Glipa hilaris, Arkansas

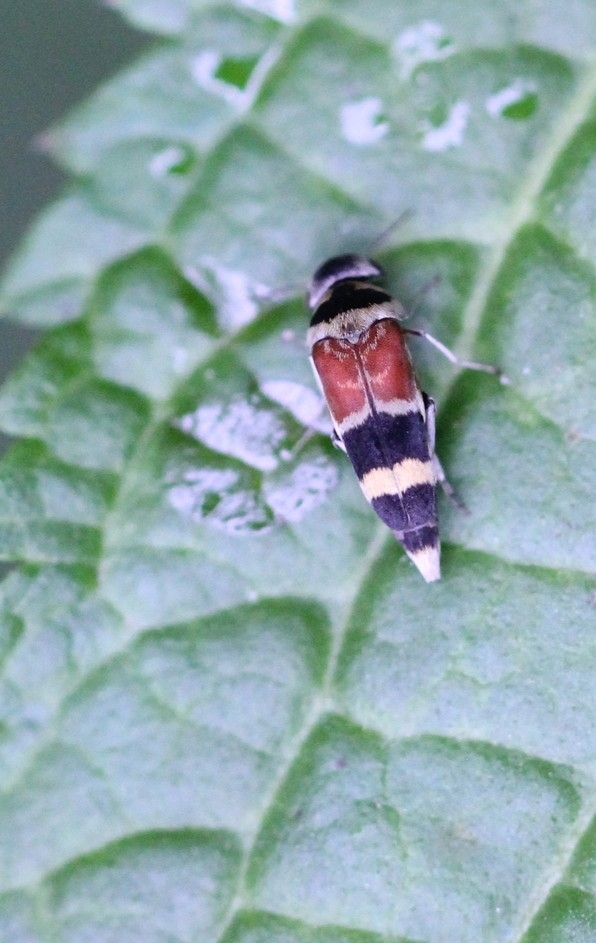
subgenus Macroglipa, China

Glipa is a genus of tumbling flower beetles in the family Mordellidae. There are more than 100 described species in Glipa.

== Species ==
These 120 species belong to the genus Glipa:

- Glipa acutimaculata Takakuwa, 2000
- Glipa afrirozui Nakane, 1949
- Glipa albannulata Takakuwa, 2000
- Glipa alboscutellata Kônô, 1934
- Glipa andamana Píc, 1941
- Glipa angustatissima Píc, 1911
- Glipa angustilineata Fan & Yang, 1993
- Glipa annulata (Redtenbacher, 1868)
- Glipa apicalis Píc, 1922
- Glipa asahinai Nakane & Nomura, 1950
- Glipa atripennis Píc, 1923
- Glipa atriventris Píc, 1923
- Glipa aurata Ray, 1930
- Glipa australiasis Píc, 1941
- Glipa azumai Nakane, 1950
- Glipa badanoi Ruzzier, 2018
- Glipa baeri Píc, 1917
- Glipa bakeri Ray, 1930
- Glipa balabacana Píc, 1917
- Glipa bandana Píc, 1932
- Glipa basiaurea Takakuwa, 2000
- Glipa basilewskyi Ermisch, 1952
- Glipa batjanensis Píc, 1917
- Glipa bicolor
- Glipa bifasciata Píc, 1920
- Glipa bisbimaculata Píc, 1911
- Glipa brevicauda Blair, 1931
- Glipa brunneipennis Ermisch, 1955
- Glipa cinereonigra (Fairmaire, 1893)
- Glipa cladoda Fan & Yang, 1993
- Glipa curtopyga Fan & Yang, 1993
- Glipa diversepubens Píc, 1941
- Glipa dohertyi Píc, 1932
- Glipa elongata McLeay
- Glipa fasciata Kôno, 1928
- Glipa favareli Píc, 1917
- Glipa flava Fan & Yang, 1993
- Glipa formosana Píc, 1911
- Glipa franciscoloi Takakuwa, 2000
- Glipa fukiensis Ermisch, 1940
- Glipa gigantea Píc, 1911
- Glipa gounellei Píc, 1917
- Glipa gracillima Takakuwa, 2000
- Glipa griseopubescens Franciscolo, 1952
- Glipa guamensis Blair, 1942
- Glipa hatayamai Takakuwa, 2000
- Glipa hieroglyphica Schwarz, 1878
- Glipa hilaris (Say, 1835)
- Glipa impressipennis Píc, 1924
- Glipa inexpectata Takakuwa, 2000
- Glipa inflammata (LeConte, 1862)
- Glipa insignata Píc, 1941
- Glipa iridescens Franciscolo, 1952
- Glipa ishigakiana Kônô, 1932
- Glipa isolata Ray, 1930
- Glipa karubei Takakuwa, 1993
- Glipa kashiwaii Takakuwa, 2000
- Glipa klapperichi Ermisch, 1940
- Glipa komiyai Takakuwa, 2000
- Glipa kurosawai Takakuwa, 1985
- Glipa kusamai Takakuwa, 1999
- Glipa laosensis Píc, 1922
- Glipa latenotata Píc, 1923
- Glipa latepyga Ermisch, 1952
- Glipa longipennis Fairmaire, 1905
- Glipa longispinosa Takakuwa, 2000
- Glipa lottini Boisduval
- Glipa luteofasciata Píc, 1930
- Glipa luteopubens Píc, 1936
- Glipa maruyamai Takakuwa, 2000
- Glipa masatakai Chûjô, 1962
- Glipa matsukai Takakuwa, 2000
- Glipa nigronotata Píc, 1941
- Glipa nigrosignata Chevrolat, 1882
- Glipa nipponica Nomura, 1957
- Glipa novaguineae Franciscolo, 1952
- Glipa obliquivittata Fan & Yang, 1993
- Glipa obliterata Píc, 1932
- Glipa obscuripennis Pic, 1912
- Glipa oculata (Say, 1835)
- Glipa ogasawarensis Kônô, 1928
- Glipa ohgushii Chûjô, 1957
- Glipa ohmomoi Takakuwa, 2000
- Glipa ornata Fairmaire, 1895
- Glipa oshimana Nomura, 1966
- Glipa oxygonia (Franciscolo, 1952)
- Glipa palawana Píc, 1923
- Glipa paulonotata Píc, 1941
- Glipa pici Ermisch, 1940
- Glipa pseudofasciata Fan & Yang, 1993
- Glipa quadrifasciata Chevrolat, 1882
- Glipa quiquefasciata Píc, 1933
- Glipa rectefasciata Píc, 1941
- Glipa rufomaculata Píc, 1923
- Glipa rufonotata Píc, 1917
- Glipa rufotincta Píc, 1917
- Glipa sachiyoae Takakuwa, 2000
- Glipa sanfilippoi Franciscolo, 1998
- Glipa satoi Nakane & Nomura, 1950
- Glipa satorum Takakuwa, 2003
- Glipa sauteri Píc, 1911
- Glipa separata Píc, 1941
- Glipa shirozui Nakane, 1949
- Glipa siamemsis Píc, 1923
- Glipa stenaliodes Blair, 1931
- Glipa suberecta Píc, 1923
- Glipa subflava Takakuwa, 2000
- Glipa subsinuata Píc, 1917
- Glipa subsinuatipennis Píc, 1936
- Glipa testaceicoxis Píc, 1917
- Glipa textilis (Montrouzier, 1855)
- Glipa thoracica Horak, 1994
- Glipa torneensis Píc, 1917
- Glipa tricolor (Wiedem, 1823)
- Glipa tripartita Píc, 1934
- Glipa uenoi Takakuwa, 1986
- Glipa vittatipennis Píc, 1928
- Glipa watanabei Takakuwa, 2000
- Glipa watanabeorum Takakuwa, 2002
- Glipa zhangi Fan & Yang, 1993
