= Stenalia graeca =

Scientific classification
- Domain: Eukaryota
- Kingdom: Animalia
- Phylum: Arthropoda
- Class: Insecta
- Order: Coleoptera
- Suborder: Polyphaga
- Infraorder: Cucujiformia
- Family: Mordellidae
- Genus: Stenalia
- Species: S. graeca

Binomial name
- Stenalia graeca Ermisch, 1965

Species of beetle

Stenalia graeca is a beetle in the genus Stenalia of the family Mordellidae. It was described in 1965 by Ermisch.
