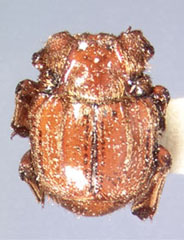

Scientific classification
- Kingdom: Animalia
- Phylum: Arthropoda
- Class: Insecta
- Order: Coleoptera
- Suborder: Polyphaga
- Infraorder: Staphyliniformia
- Family: Histeridae
- Genus: Haeterius
- Species: H. tristriatus

Binomial name
- Haeterius tristriatus Horn, 1874

Synonyms
- Haeterius carri Hatch, 1926; Haeterius hornii Wickham, 1892; Haeterius loripes Casey, 1916

= Haeterius tristriatus =

Species of beetle

Haeterius tristriatus is a species of clown beetle in the family Histeridae. It is found in North America.
