= Haeterius zelus =

Scientific classification
- Kingdom: Animalia
- Phylum: Arthropoda
- Class: Insecta
- Order: Coleoptera
- Suborder: Polyphaga
- Infraorder: Staphyliniformia
- Family: Histeridae
- Genus: Haeterius
- Species: H. zelus

Binomial name
- Haeterius zelus Fall, 1917

Species of beetle

Haeterius zelus is a species of clown beetle in the family Histeridae. It is found in North America.
