= Haeterius brunneipennis =

Scientific classification
- Kingdom: Animalia
- Phylum: Arthropoda
- Class: Insecta
- Order: Coleoptera
- Suborder: Polyphaga
- Infraorder: Staphyliniformia
- Family: Histeridae
- Genus: Haeterius
- Species: H. brunneipennis

Binomial name
- Haeterius brunneipennis (Randall, 1838)

Species of beetle

Haeterius brunneipennis is a species in the family Histeridae ("clown beetles"), in the order Coleoptera ("beetles"). It is found in North America.
