= Stenalia brunneipennis =

Scientific classification
- Domain: Eukaryota
- Kingdom: Animalia
- Phylum: Arthropoda
- Class: Insecta
- Order: Coleoptera
- Suborder: Polyphaga
- Infraorder: Cucujiformia
- Family: Mordellidae
- Genus: Stenalia
- Species: S. brunneipennis

Binomial name
- Stenalia brunneipennis Mulsant, 1856

Species of beetle

Stenalia brunneipennis is a beetle in the genus Stenalia of the family Mordellidae. It was described in 1856.

== Subspecies ==
- Stenalia brunneipennis brunneipennis Mulsant, 1856
- Stenalia brunneipennis unistrigosa Chobaut, 1924
