= Clivina brunnipennis =

Scientific classification
- Domain: Eukaryota
- Kingdom: Animalia
- Phylum: Arthropoda
- Class: Insecta
- Order: Coleoptera
- Suborder: Adephaga
- Family: Carabidae
- Subfamily: Scaritinae
- Tribe: Clivinini
- Subtribe: Clivinina
- Genus: Clivina
- Species: C. brunnipennis

Binomial name
- Clivina brunnipennis Putzeys, 1846

Synonyms
- Clivina brunneipennis Putzeys, 1846

Species of beetle

Clivina brunnipennis is a species of ground beetle in the family Carabidae, found in Central and North America.
