= Crematogaster brunneipennis =

Scientific classification
- Domain: Eukaryota
- Kingdom: Animalia
- Phylum: Arthropoda
- Class: Insecta
- Order: Hymenoptera
- Family: Formicidae
- Subfamily: Myrmicinae
- Genus: Crematogaster
- Species: C. brunneipennis

Binomial name
- Crematogaster brunneipennis Andre, 1890

Species of ant

Crematogaster brunneipennis is a species of ant in tribe Crematogastrini. It was described by Andre in 1890.
