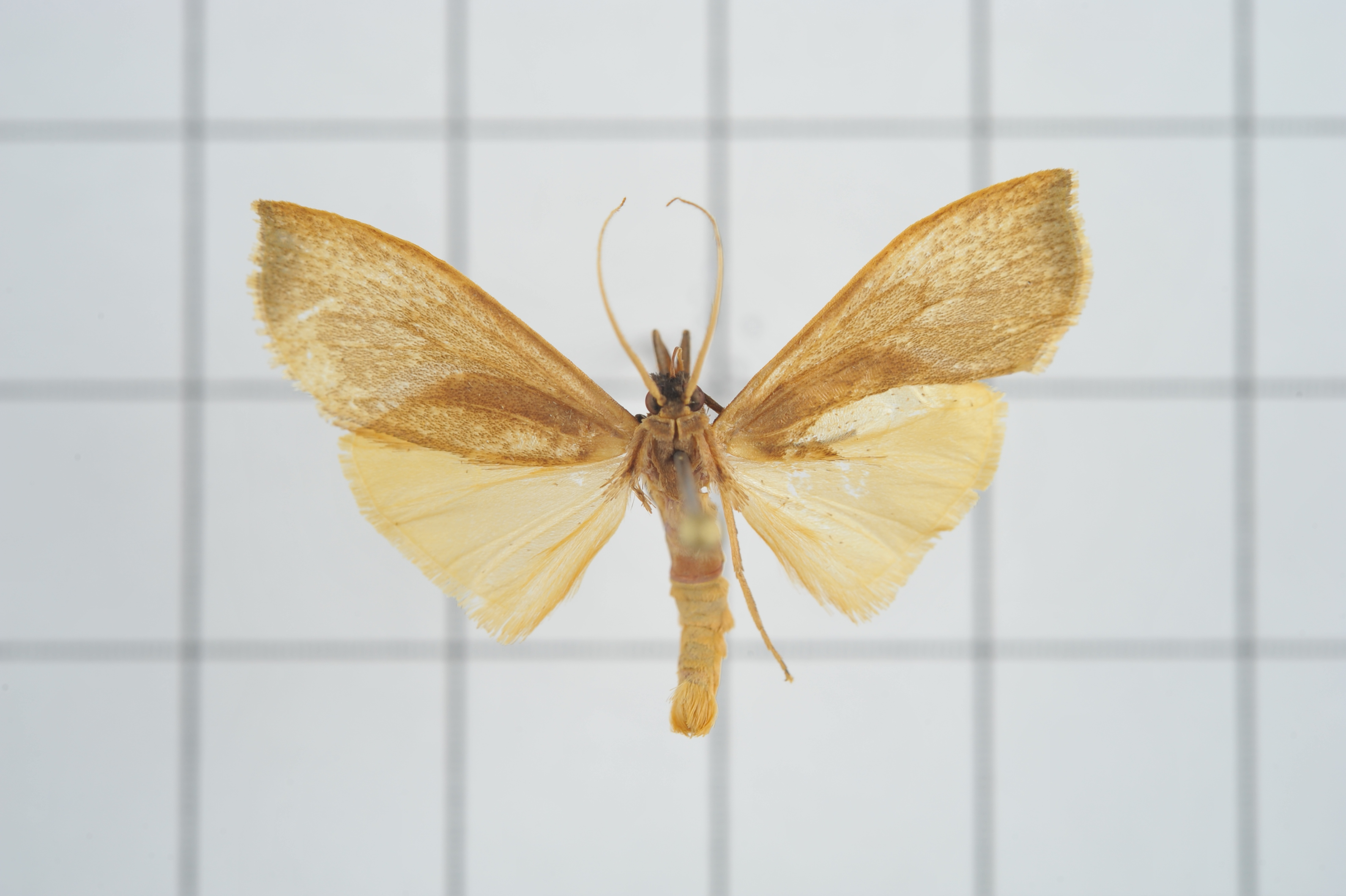

Scientific classification
- Kingdom: Animalia
- Phylum: Arthropoda
- Clade: Pancrustacea
- Class: Insecta
- Order: Lepidoptera
- Superfamily: Noctuoidea
- Family: Erebidae
- Subfamily: Arctiinae
- Subtribe: Lithosiina
- Genus: Nishada; Moore, 1878

Synonyms
- Petalopleura Meyrick, 1889

= Nishada (moth) =

Genus of moths

Nishada is a genus of moths in the family Erebidae. They are found in India, Sri Lanka, Myanmar, Sumatra, and Borneo.

== Description ==
Palpi short and porrect (extending forward) where the second joint is hairy. Antennae of male with cilia and bristles, the upper surface covered with rough scales. Forewing broad. The costa much arched and a large smooth patch on the inner area of underside for the articulation of the hindwing. Vein 5 absent. Veins 7 to 9 stalked. Vein 11 anastomosing (fusing) with vein 12. Hindwing of male with a costal fold from which large scales project. Vein 4 absent. In female, vein 3,4 and 6,7 stalked. Vein 5 absent and vein 8 from middle of cell.

== Species ==
- Nishada aurantiaca Rothschild, 1913
- Nishada aureocincta Debauche, 1938
- Nishada benjaminea Roepke, 1946
- Nishada brunneipennis Hampson, 1911
- Nishada chilomorpha (Snellen, 1877)
- Nishada flabrifera Moore, 1878
- Nishada impervia Walker, 1864
- Nishada marginalis (Felder, 1875)
- Nishada melanistis Swinhoe, 1902
- Nishada niveola Hampson, 1900
- Nishada rotundipennis (Walker, 1862)
- Nishada sambara (Moore, 1859)
- Nishada schintlmeisteri Dubatolov & Bucsek, 2013
- Nishada syntomioides (Walker, 1862)
- Nishada tula Swinhoe, 1900
- Nishada xantholoma (Snellen, 1879)
