= Nishada brunneipennis =

Scientific classification
- Kingdom: Animalia
- Phylum: Arthropoda
- Class: Insecta
- Order: Lepidoptera
- Superfamily: Noctuoidea
- Family: Erebidae
- Subfamily: Arctiinae
- Genus: Nishada
- Species: N. brunneipennis

Binomial name
- Nishada brunneipennis Hampson, 1911

Species of moth

Nishada brunneipennis is a moth of the family Erebidae. It was described by George Hampson (British entomologist) in 1911. It is found on the Moluccas.
