= Hiromichi Kono =

Japanese entomologist and anthropologist

Hiromichi Kono (河野 広道, Kōno Hiromichi; 7 January 1905 – 12 July 1963) was a Japanese entomologist and anthropologist. His academic training, at Hokkaido Imperial University, was in entomology, and he became a faculty member in the Biology Department at that institution. His emphasis within entomology was on Coleoptera, his doctoral work (completed circa 1932) concerning a Japanese billbug (Okada, 1964). He performed taxonomic work in Coleoptera as well, describing a new genus of Lycid beetle, Benibotarus (ITIS). His academic work in biology was interrupted due to World War II, and he left Hokkaido University in 1944 (Okada, 1964). During this time, he took up the study of anthropology, following in the footsteps of his father, Tsunekichi Kōno (d. 1930). Both father and son studied the Ainu of Hokkaido, and Hiromichi amassed an important collection of Ainu material (Beardsley, 1959; Okada, 1964).
