= Takehiko Nakane =

Japanese entomologist (1920 - 1999)

- Born: January 1, 1920
- Died: 26 March 1999 (aged 79)
- Citizenship: Japan
- Scientific career
- Fields: entomology Beetles
- Institutions: Kyoto University, National Museum of Nature and Science, Kagoshima University
- Author abbrev. (zoology): Nakane

Takehiko Nakane (1920-March 26, 1999) was a Japanese entomologist.

== Life ==
Nakane studied and worked at Kyoto University in Japan from 1951 to 1964. Subsequently, from 1965 to 1978, he worked in Tokyo for the natural history department of the National Museum of Science. In 1978 he received his doctorate from Kagoshima University, where he worked until his retirement in 1986. He worked on Japanese native beetle taxa, and was the author or co-author of approximately 870 publications. Much of this led to the work "Iconographia Insectorum Japanicorum Colore Naturali Edita", for which he wrote the section on Coleoptera. He described many beetle species new to science.

== See also ==
- Category:Taxa named by Takehiko Nakane
