= Akephorus marinus =

Scientific classification
- Domain: Eukaryota
- Kingdom: Animalia
- Phylum: Arthropoda
- Class: Insecta
- Order: Coleoptera
- Suborder: Adephaga
- Family: Carabidae
- Genus: Akephorus
- Species: A. marinus

Binomial name
- Akephorus marinus LeConte, 1852

Species of beetle

Akephorus marinus is a species of ground beetle in the family Carabidae. It is found in Central America and North America.
