= Akephorus =

Scientific classification
- Domain: Eukaryota
- Kingdom: Animalia
- Phylum: Arthropoda
- Class: Insecta
- Order: Coleoptera
- Suborder: Adephaga
- Family: Carabidae
- Subfamily: Scaritinae
- Tribe: Dyschiriini
- Genus: Akephorus; LeConte, 1851

Species
- See text

Genus of beetles

Akephorus is a genus of beetles in the family Carabidae.

== Species ==
The genus contains the following species:

- Akephorus marinus LeConte, 1852
- Akephorus obesus (LeConte, 1866)
