= Akephorus obesus =

Scientific classification
- Domain: Eukaryota
- Kingdom: Animalia
- Phylum: Arthropoda
- Class: Insecta
- Order: Coleoptera
- Suborder: Adephaga
- Family: Carabidae
- Genus: Akephorus
- Species: A. obesus

Binomial name
- Akephorus obesus (LeConte, 1863)

Synonyms
- Dyschirius obesus LeConte, 1863

Species of beetle

Akephorus obesus is a species of ground beetle in the family Carabidae. It is found in North America.
