= Striganoviella vanhillei =

Scientific classification
- Domain: Eukaryota
- Kingdom: Animalia
- Phylum: Arthropoda
- Class: Insecta
- Order: Coleoptera
- Suborder: Adephaga
- Family: Carabidae
- Genus: Striganoviella
- Species: S. vanhillei

Binomial name
- Striganoviella vanhillei (Basilewsky, 1962)

Species of beetle

Striganoviella vanhillei is a species of ground beetle in the subfamily Scaritinae. It is known to occur in South Africa.
