= Striganoviella =

Scientific classification
- Domain: Eukaryota
- Kingdom: Animalia
- Phylum: Arthropoda
- Class: Insecta
- Order: Coleoptera
- Suborder: Adephaga
- Family: Carabidae
- Subfamily: Scaritinae
- Tribe: Dyschiriini
- Genus: Striganoviella; Fedorenko, 2012

Genus of beetles

Striganoviella is a genus of beetles in the family Carabidae.

== Species ==
There are at least three species in this genus:

- Striganoviella janaki Bulirsch & Magrini, 2019
- Striganoviella subopaca Fedorenko, 2012
- Striganoviella vanhillei (Basilewsky, 1962)
