= Chain mail =

Personal armour of metal links

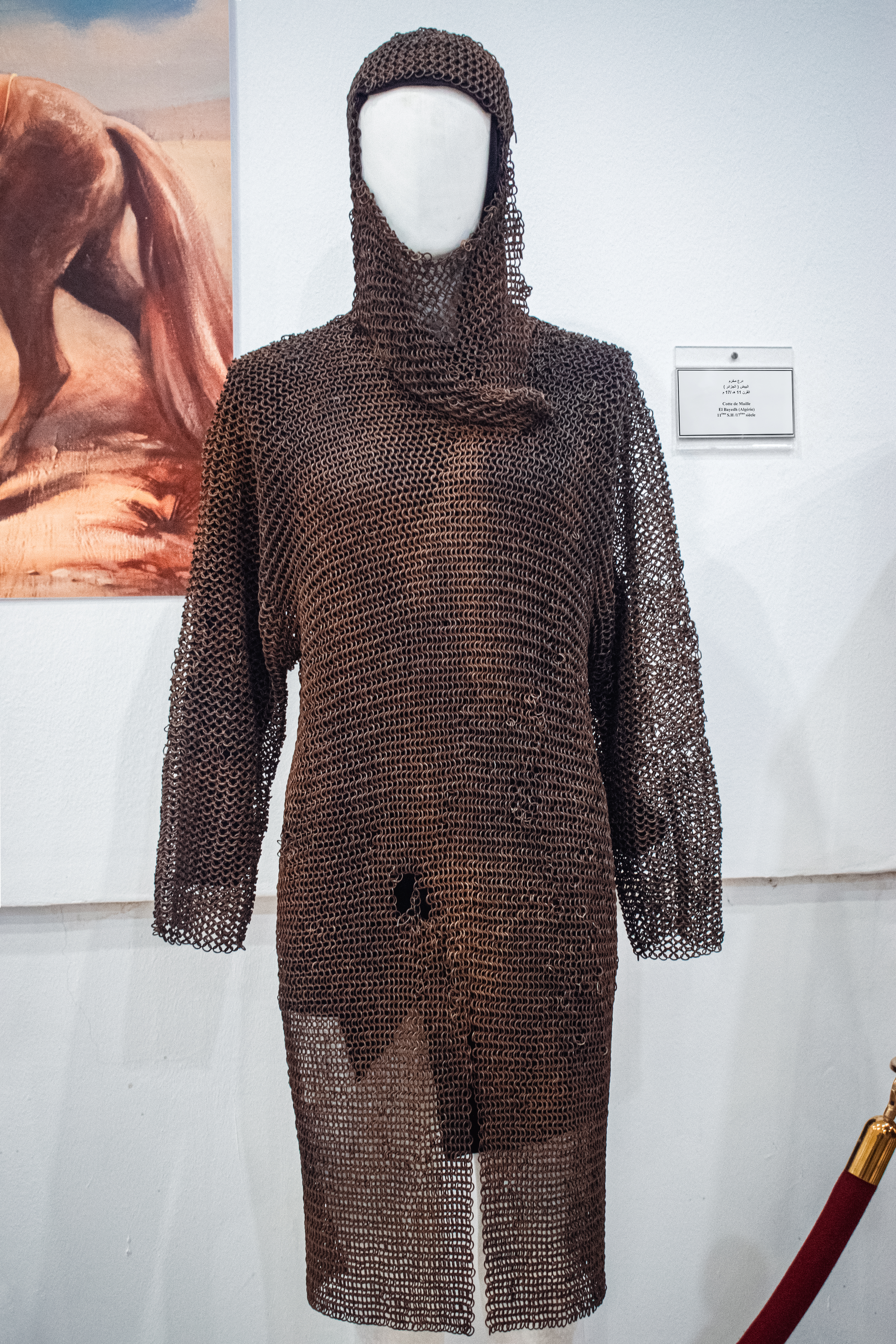
A 17th-century chainmail hauberk from El Bayadh, Algeria

Mail (sometimes spelled maille and, since the 18th century, colloquially referred to as chain mail, chainmail, or chain-mail) is a type of armour consisting of small metal rings linked together in a pattern to form a mesh. It was widely used in European militaries from the 3rd century BC to the 16th century AD, while in Asia, Africa, and the Middle East it remained in military use until 18th century. Chain mail is still in use in industries such as butchery and as protection against the powerful bites of creatures such as sharks. A coat of this armour is often called a hauberk or sometimes a byrnie.

== Etymology ==
The origin of the word mail is not fully known. One theory is that it originally derives from the Latin word macula, meaning 'spot' or 'opacity' (as in macula of retina). Another theory relates the word to the old French maillier, meaning 'to hammer' (related to the modern English word malleable). In modern French, maille refers to a loop or stitch. The Arabic words burnus (برنوس 'burnoose, a hooded cloak', also a chasuble worn by Coptic priests) and barnaza (برنز 'to bronze') suggest an Arabic influence for the Carolingian armour known as byrnie (see below).

The first attestations of the word mail are in Old French and Anglo-Norman: maille, maile, or male or other variants, which became mailye, maille, maile, male, or meile in Middle English.

In early medieval Europe "byrn(ie)" was the equivalent of a "coat of mail"

Civilizations that used mail invented specific terms for each garment made from it. The standard terms for European mail armour derive from French: leggings are called chausses, a hood is a mail coif, and mittens, mitons. A mail collar hanging from a helmet is a camail or aventail. A shirt made of mail is a hauberk if knee-length and a haubergeon if mid-thigh length. A layer (or multiple layers) of mail sandwiched between layers of fabric is called a jazerant.

A waist-length coat in medieval Europe was called a byrnie, although the exact construction of a byrnie is unclear, including whether it was constructed of mail or other armour types. Noting that the byrnie was the "most highly valued piece of armour" to the Carolingian soldier, Bennet, Bradbury, DeVries, Dickie, and Jestice indicate that:

There is some dispute among historians as to what exactly constituted the Carolingian byrnie. Relying... only on artistic and some literary sources because of the lack of archaeological examples, some believe that it was a heavy leather jacket with metal scales sewn onto it with strong thread. It was also quite long, reaching below the hips and covering most of the arms. Other historians claim instead that the Carolingian byrnie was nothing more than a coat of mail, but longer and perhaps heavier than traditional early medieval mail. Without more certain evidence, this dispute will continue.

== History ==
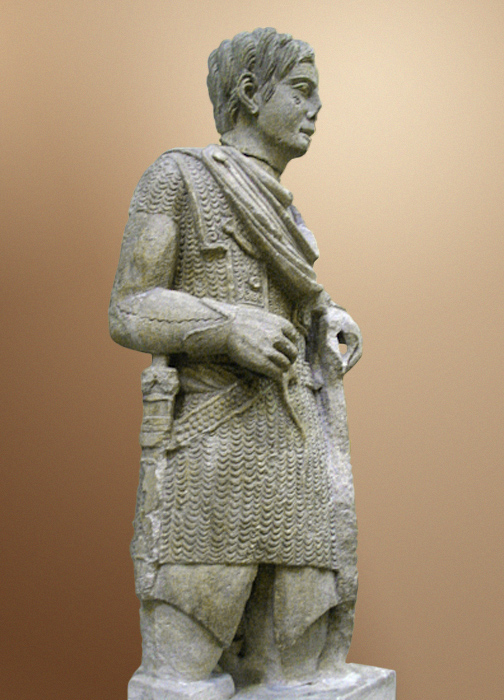
The Vachères warrior, 1st century BC, a statue depicting a Romanized Gaulish warrior wearing mail and a Celtic torc around his neck, bearing a Celtic-style shield.

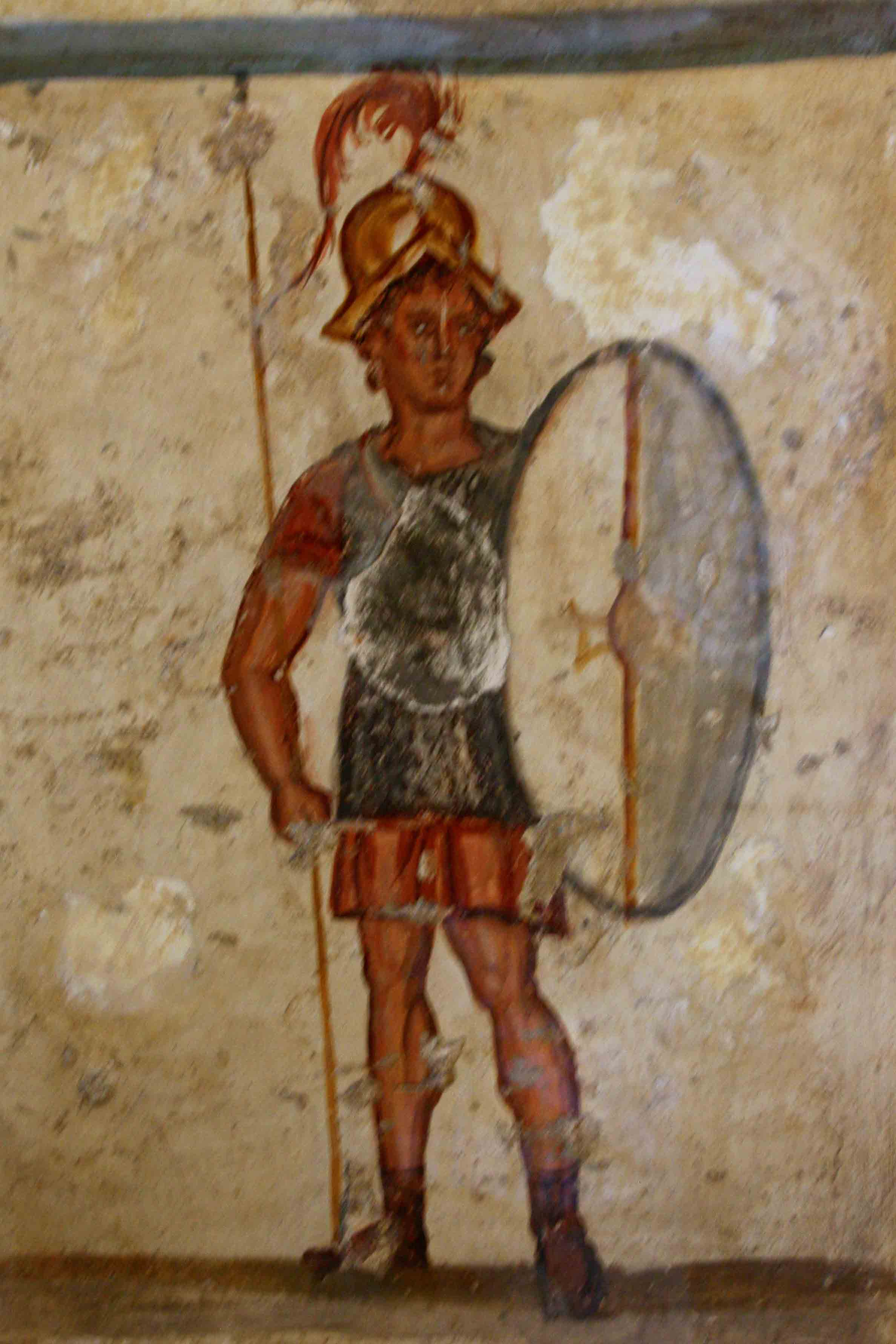
Fresco of an ancient Macedonian Greek soldier (thorakites) wearing mail armour and bearing a thureos shield

The earliest examples of surviving mail were found in the Carpathian Basin at a burial in Horný Jatov, Slovakia dated in the 3rd century BC, and in a chieftain's burial located in Ciumești, Romania. Its invention is commonly credited to the Celts, but there are examples of Etruscan pattern mail dating from at least the 4th century BC. Mail may have been inspired by the much earlier scale armour. Mail spread to North Africa, West Africa, the Middle East, Central Asia, India, Tibet, South East Asia, and Japan.

Herodotus wrote that the ancient Persians wore scale armour, but mail is also distinctly mentioned in the Avesta, the holy scripture of the Zoroastrian religion that was written in the 6th century BC.

Mail continues to be used in the 21st century as a component of stab-resistant body armour, cut-resistant gloves for butchers and woodworkers, shark-resistant wet-suits for defense against shark bites, and a number of other applications.

=== In Europe ===
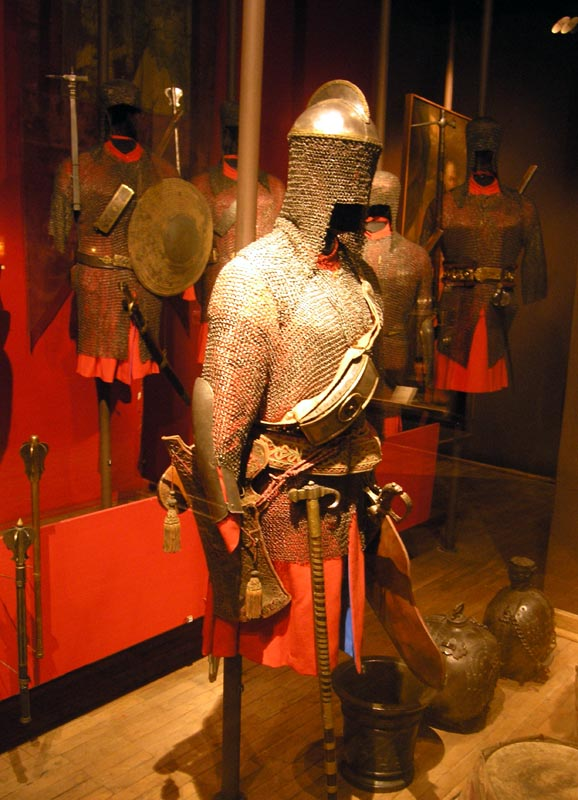
Mail armour and equipment of Polish medium cavalryman, from the second half of the 17th century

The use of mail as battlefield armour was common during the Iron Age and the Middle Ages, becoming less common over the course of the 16th and 17th centuries when plate armour and more advanced firearms were developed. It is believed that the Roman Republic first came into contact with mail fighting the Gauls in Cisalpine Gaul, now Northern Italy. The Roman army adopted the technology for their troops in the form of the lorica hamata which was used as a primary form of armour through the Imperial period.

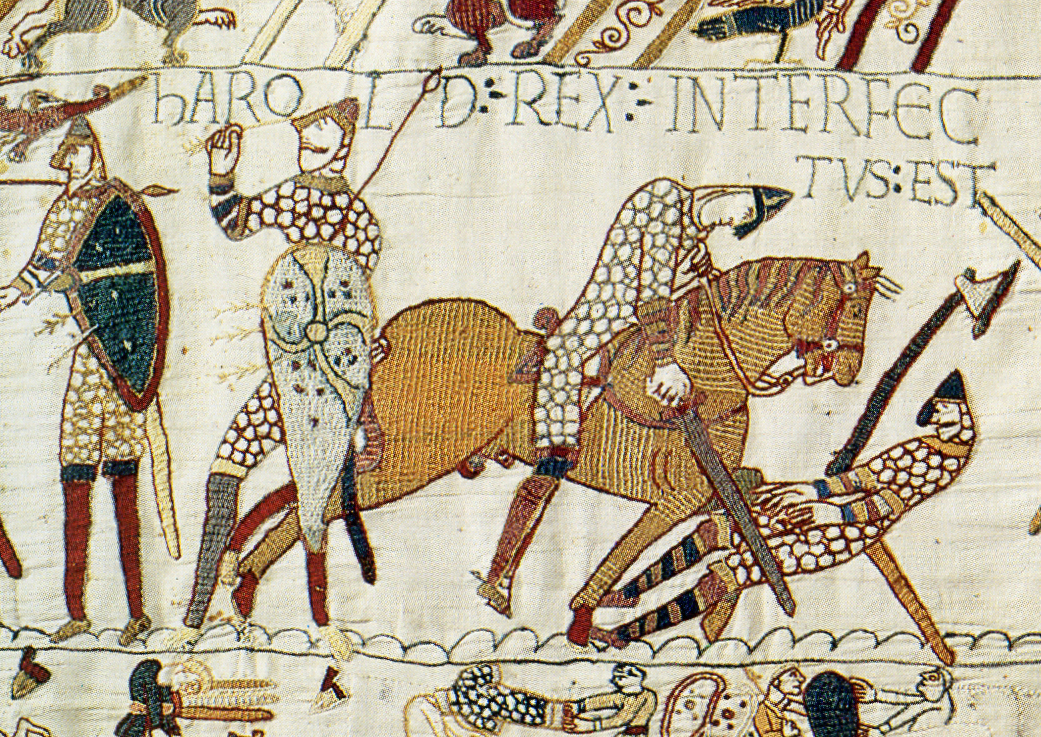
Panel from the Bayeux Tapestry showing Norman and Anglo-Saxon soldiers in mail armour. Note the scene of stripping a mail hauberk from a dead combatant at bottom.

After the fall of the Western Empire, much of the infrastructure needed to create plate armour diminished. Eventually the word "mail" came to be synonymous with armour. It was typically an extremely prized commodity, as it was expensive and time-consuming to produce and could mean the difference between life and death in a battle. Historically mail makers were often men, but women also undertook the work: Alice la Haubergere was an armourer who worked in Cheapside in the early 1300s and in York in 1446 Agnes Hecche inherited her father's mail making tools to continue her work after his death. Mail from dead combatants was frequently looted and was used by the new owner or sold for a lucrative price. As time went on and infrastructure improved, it came to be used by more soldiers. The oldest intact mail hauberk still in existence is thought to have been worn by Leopold III, Duke of Austria, who died in 1386 during the Battle of Sempach.

By the 14th century, articulated plate armour was commonly used to supplement mail. Eventually mail was supplanted by plate for the most part, as it provided greater protection against windlass crossbows, bludgeoning weapons, and lance charges while maintaining most of the mobility of mail. However, it was still widely used by many soldiers, along with brigandines and padded jacks. These three types of armour made up the bulk of the equipment used by soldiers, with mail being the most expensive. It was sometimes more expensive than plate armour. Mail typically persisted longer in less technologically advanced areas such as Eastern Europe but was in use throughout Europe into the 16th century.

During the late 19th and early 20th century, mail was used as a material for bulletproof vests, most notably by the Wilkinson Sword Company. Results were unsatisfactory; Wilkinson mail worn by the Khedive of Egypt's regiment of "Iron Men" was manufactured from split rings which proved to be too brittle, and the rings would fragment when struck by bullets and aggravate the injury. The riveted mail armour worn by the opposing Sudanese Mahdists did not have the same problem but also proved to be relatively useless against the firearms of British forces at the battle of Omdurman. During World War I, Wilkinson Sword transitioned from mail to a lamellar design which was the precursor to the flak jacket.

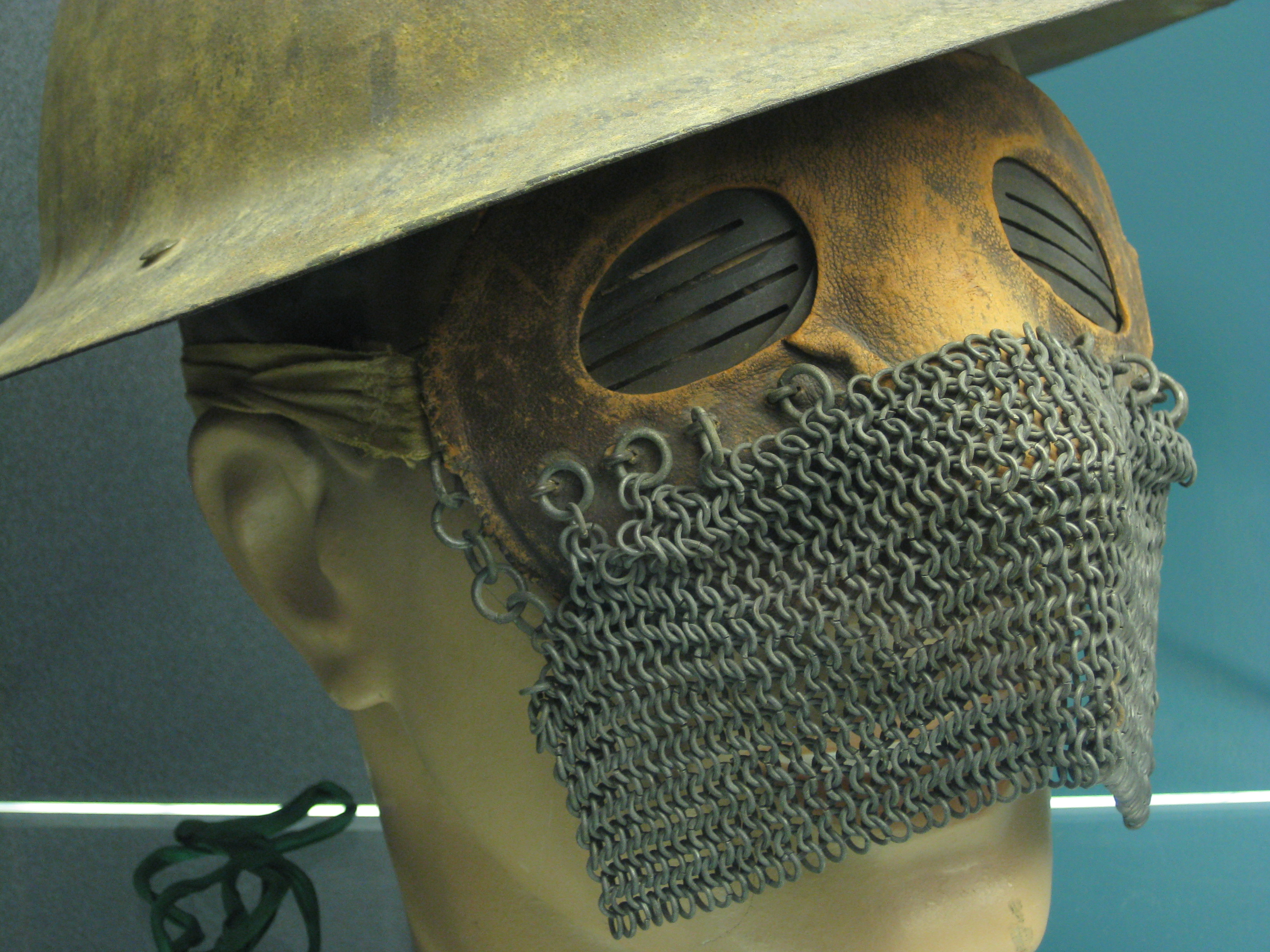
WWI Splatter Mask on display at the Army Medical Services Museum

Mail was also used for face protection in World War I. Oculist Captain Cruise of the British Infantry designed a mail fringe to be attached to helmets to protect the upper face. This proved unpopular with soldiers, in spite of being proven to defend against a three-ounce (85 g) shrapnel round fired at a distance of one hundred yards (91 m). Another invention, a "splatter mask" or "splinter mask", consisted of rigid upper face protection and a mail veil to protect the lower face, and was used by early tank crews as a measure against flying steel fragments (spalling) inside the vehicle.

=== In Asia ===
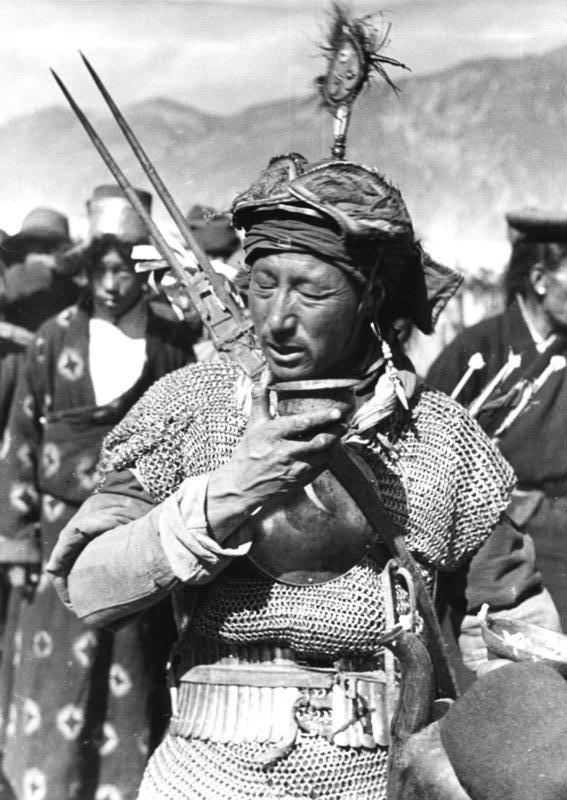
Tibetan warrior in mail reinforced by additional mirror plate, photographed during Tibetan New Year in 1938.

Mail armour was introduced to the Middle East and Asia through the Romans and was adopted by the Sassanid Persians starting in the 3rd century AD, where it was supplemental to the scale and lamellar armour already used. Mail was commonly also used as horse armour for cataphracts and heavy cavalry as well as armour for the soldiers themselves. Asian mail could be just as heavy as the European variety and sometimes had prayer symbols stamped on the rings as a sign of their craftsmanship as well as for divine protection.

Mail armour is mentioned in the Quran as being a gift revealed by Allah to David:

21:80 It was We Who taught him the making of coats of mail for your benefit, to guard you from each other's violence: will ye then be grateful? (Yusuf Ali's translation)

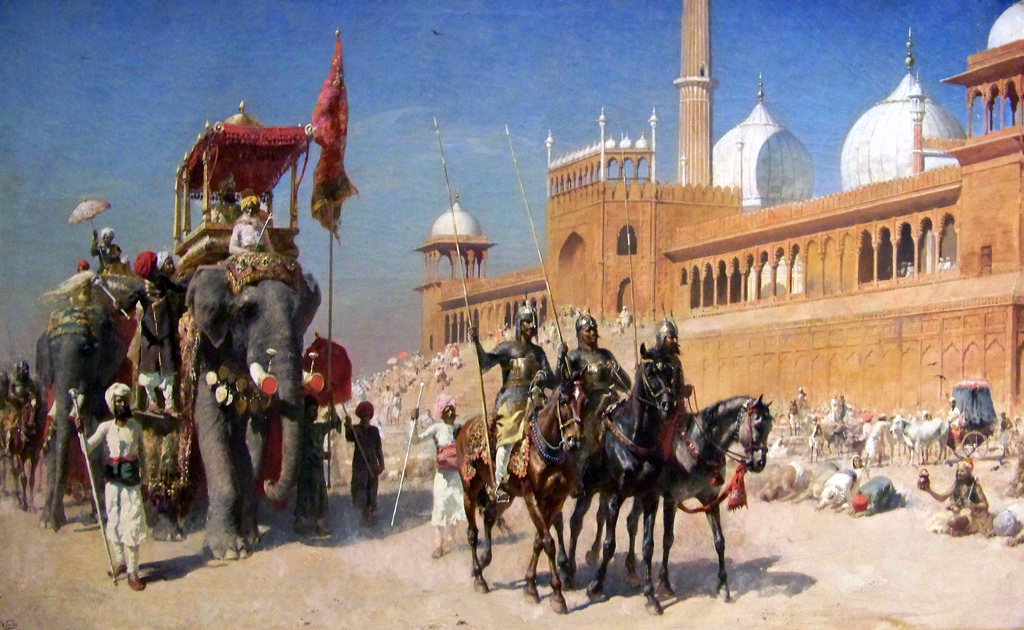
Painting of the Mughal cavalry in chain mail leading a royal riding his elephant.

From the Abbasid Caliphate, mail was quickly adopted in Central Asia by Timur (Tamerlane) and the Sogdians, and by India's Delhi Sultanate. Mail armour was introduced by the Turks in late 12th century and commonly used by Turk and the Mughal and Suri armies where it eventually became the armour of choice in India. Indian mail was constructed with alternating rows of solid links and round riveted links and it was often integrated with plate protection (mail and plate armour).

In the islands across Southeast Asia, chain mail are often made as "chain shirts" (baju rantai).

=== China ===
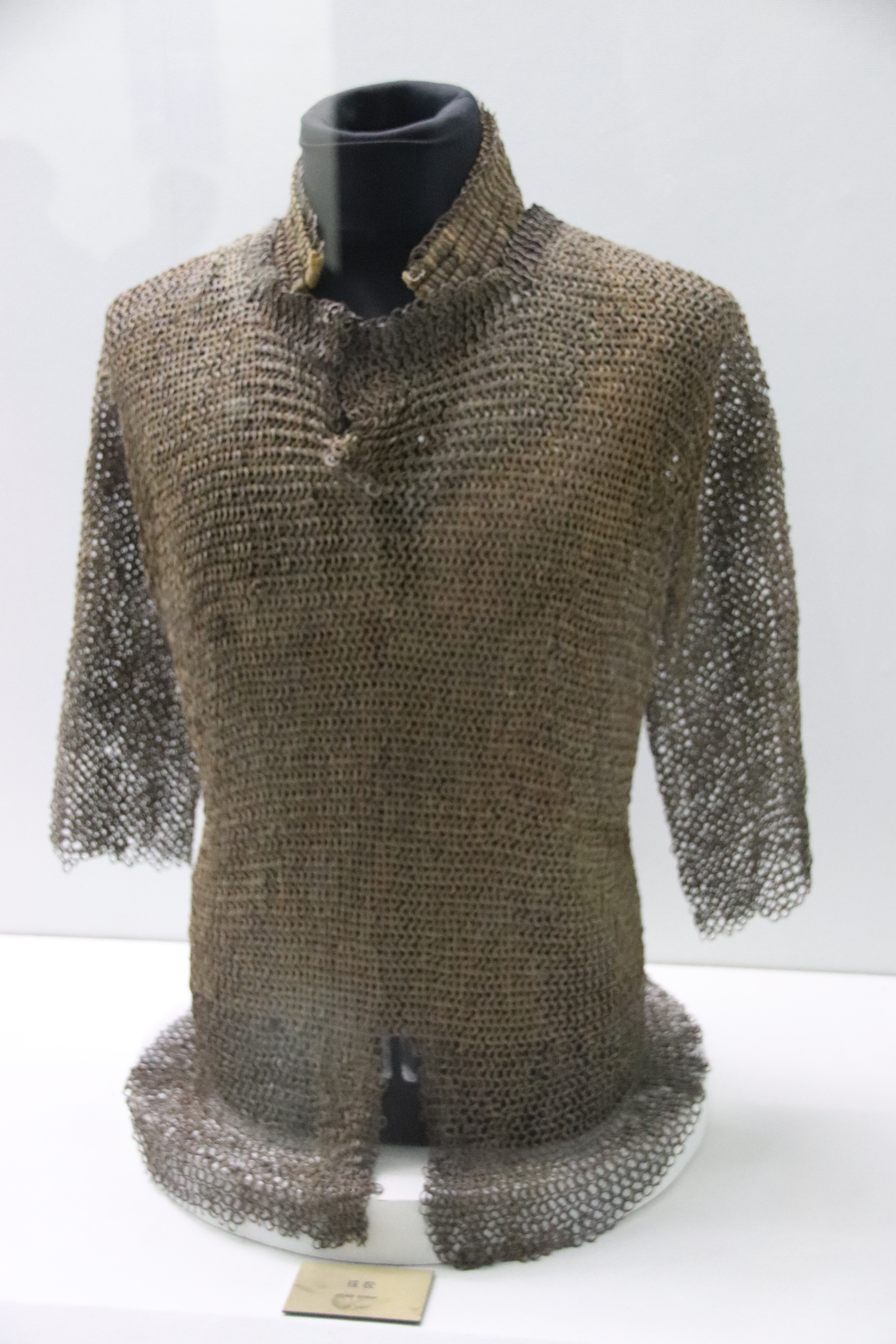

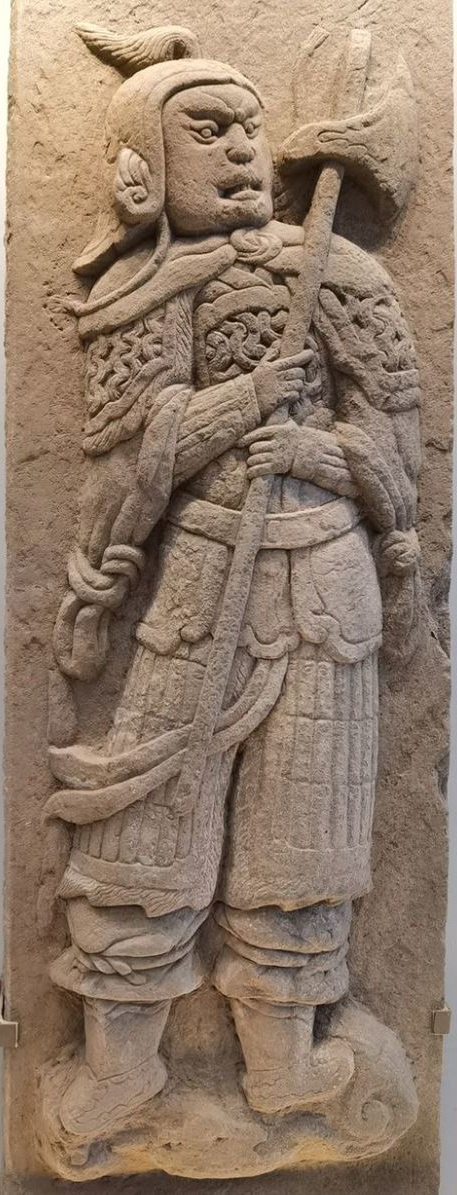
Song axeman in mail and lamellar armour

Left: Western Xia mail armour. Right: Song dynasty axeman in mail and lamellar armour

Mail was introduced to China when its allies in Central Asia paid tribute to the Tang Emperor in 718 by giving him a coat of "link armour" assumed to be mail. Earliest assumed reference to mail can be found in early 3rd century record by Cao Zhi, being called "chained ring armor". China first encountered the armour in 384 when its allies in the nation of Kuchi arrived wearing "armour similar to chains". Once in China, mail was imported but was not produced widely. Due to its flexibility, comfort, and rarity, it was typically the armour of high-ranking guards and those who could afford the exotic import (to show off their social status) rather than the armour of the rank and file, who used more common brigandine, scale, and lamellar types. However, it was one of the few military products that China imported from foreigners. Mail spread to Korea slightly later where it was imported as the armour of imperial guards and generals.

=== Japan ===
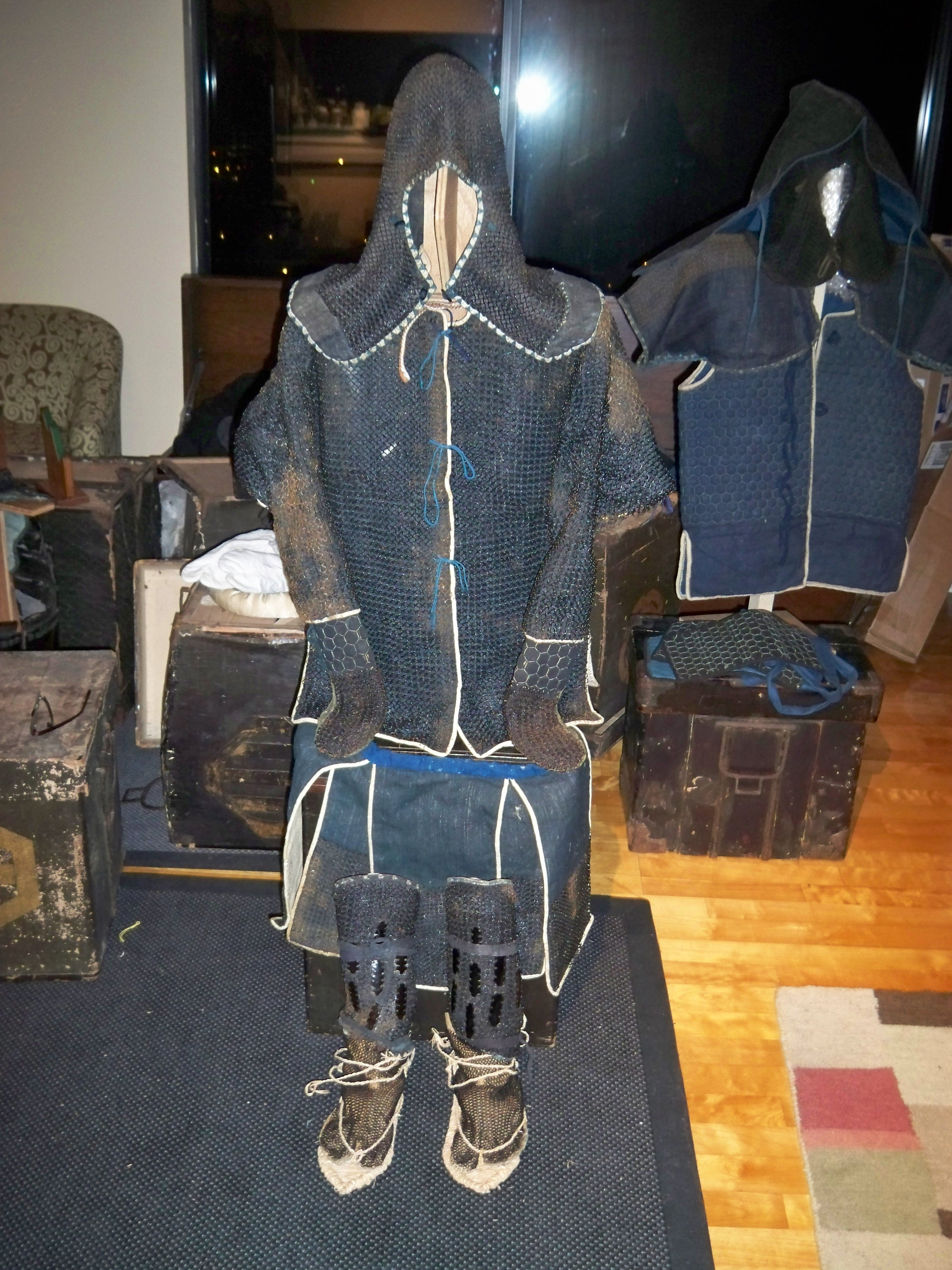
Edo period Japanese (samurai) chain armour or kusari gusoku

In Japan, mail is called kusari which means chain. When the word kusari is used in conjunction with an armoured item it usually means that mail makes up the majority of the armour composition. An example of this would be kusari gusoku which means chain armour. Kusari jackets, hoods, gloves, vests, shin guards, shoulder guards, thigh guards, and other armoured clothing were produced, even kusari tabi socks.

Kusari was used in samurai armour at least from the time of the Mongol invasion (1270s) but particularly from the Nambokucho Period (1336–1392). The Japanese used many different weave methods including a square 4-in-1 pattern (so gusari), a hexagonal 6-in-1 pattern (hana gusari) and a European 4-in-1 (nanban gusari). The rings of Japanese mail were much smaller than their European counterparts; they would be used in patches to link together plates and to drape over vulnerable areas such as the armpits.

Riveted kusari was known and used in Japan. On page 58 of the book Japanese Arms & Armor: Introduction by H. Russell Robinson, there is a picture of Japanese riveted kusari, and this quote from the translated reference of Sakakibara Kozan's 1800 book, The Manufacture of Armour and Helmets in Sixteenth-Century Japan, shows that the Japanese not only knew of and used riveted kusari but that they manufactured it as well.

... karakuri-namban (riveted namban), with stout links each closed by a rivet. Its invention is credited to Fukushima Dembei Kunitaka, pupil, of Hojo Awa no Kami Ujifusa, but it is also said to be derived directly from foreign models. It is heavy because the links are tinned (biakuro-nagashi) and these are also sharp-edged because they are punched out of iron plate

Butted or split (twisted) links made up the majority of kusari links used by the Japanese. Links were either butted together meaning that the ends touched each other and were not riveted, or the kusari was constructed with links where the wire was turned or twisted two or more times; these split links are similar to the modern split ring commonly used on keychains. The rings were lacquered black to prevent rusting, and were always stitched onto a backing of cloth or leather. The kusari was sometimes concealed entirely between layers of cloth.

Kusari gusoku or chain armour was commonly used during the Edo period 1603 to 1868 as a stand-alone defense. According to George Cameron Stone

Entire suits of mail kusari gusoku were worn on occasions, sometimes under the ordinary clothing

In his book Arms and Armor of the Samurai: The History of Weaponry in Ancient Japan, Ian Bottomley shows a picture of a kusari armour and mentions kusari katabira (chain jackets) with detachable arms being worn by samurai police officials during the Edo period. The end of the samurai era in the 1860s, along with the 1876 ban on wearing swords in public, marked the end of any practical use for mail and other armour in Japan. Japan turned to a conscription army and uniforms replaced armour.

== Effectiveness ==
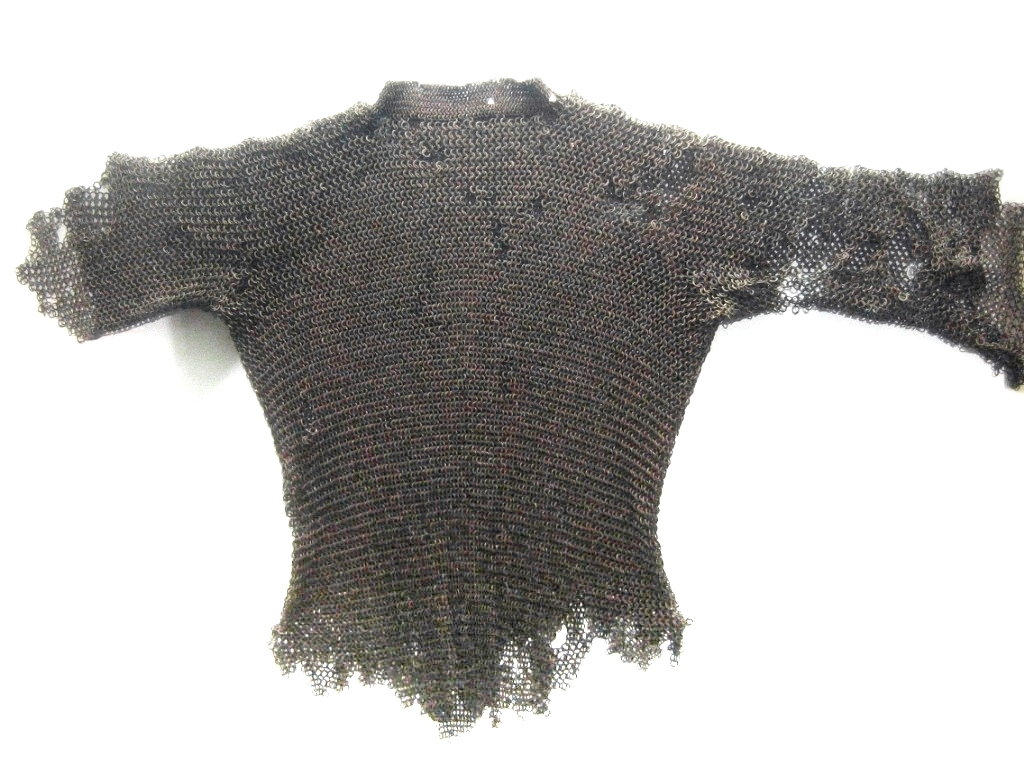
Mail hauberk from the Museum of Bayeux

Mail's resistance to weapons is determined by four factors: linkage type (riveted, butted, or welded), material used (iron versus bronze or steel), weave density (a tighter weave needs a thinner weapon to surpass), and ring thickness (generally ranging from 1.0 to 1.6 mm diameter (18 to 14 gauge) wire in most examples). Mail, if a warrior could afford it, provided a significant advantage when combined with competent fighting techniques.

When the mail was not riveted, a thrust from most sharp weapons could penetrate it. However, when mail was riveted, only a strong well-placed thrust from certain spears, or thin or dedicated mail-piercing swords like the estoc, could penetrate, and a pollaxe or halberd blow could break through the armour. Strong projectile weapons such as stronger self bows, recurve bows, and crossbows could also penetrate riveted mail. Some evidence indicates that during armoured combat, the intention was to actually get around the armour rather than through it—according to a study of skeletons found at the battle of Visby, Gotland, a majority of the skeletons showed wounds on less well protected legs. Although mail was a formidable protection, due to technological advances as time progressed, mail worn under plate armour (and stand-alone mail as well) could be penetrated by the conventional weaponry of another knight.

The flexibility of mail meant that a blow would often injure the wearer, potentially causing serious bruising or fractures, and it was a poor defence against head trauma. Mail-clad warriors typically wore separate rigid helms over their mail coifs for head protection. Likewise, blunt weapons such as maces and warhammers could harm the wearer by their impact without penetrating the armour; usually a soft armour, such as gambeson, was worn under the hauberk. Medieval surgeons were very well capable of setting and caring for bone fractures resulting from blunt weapons. With the poor understanding of hygiene, however, cuts that could get infected were much more of a problem. Thus mail armour proved to be sufficient protection in most situations.

== Manufacture ==
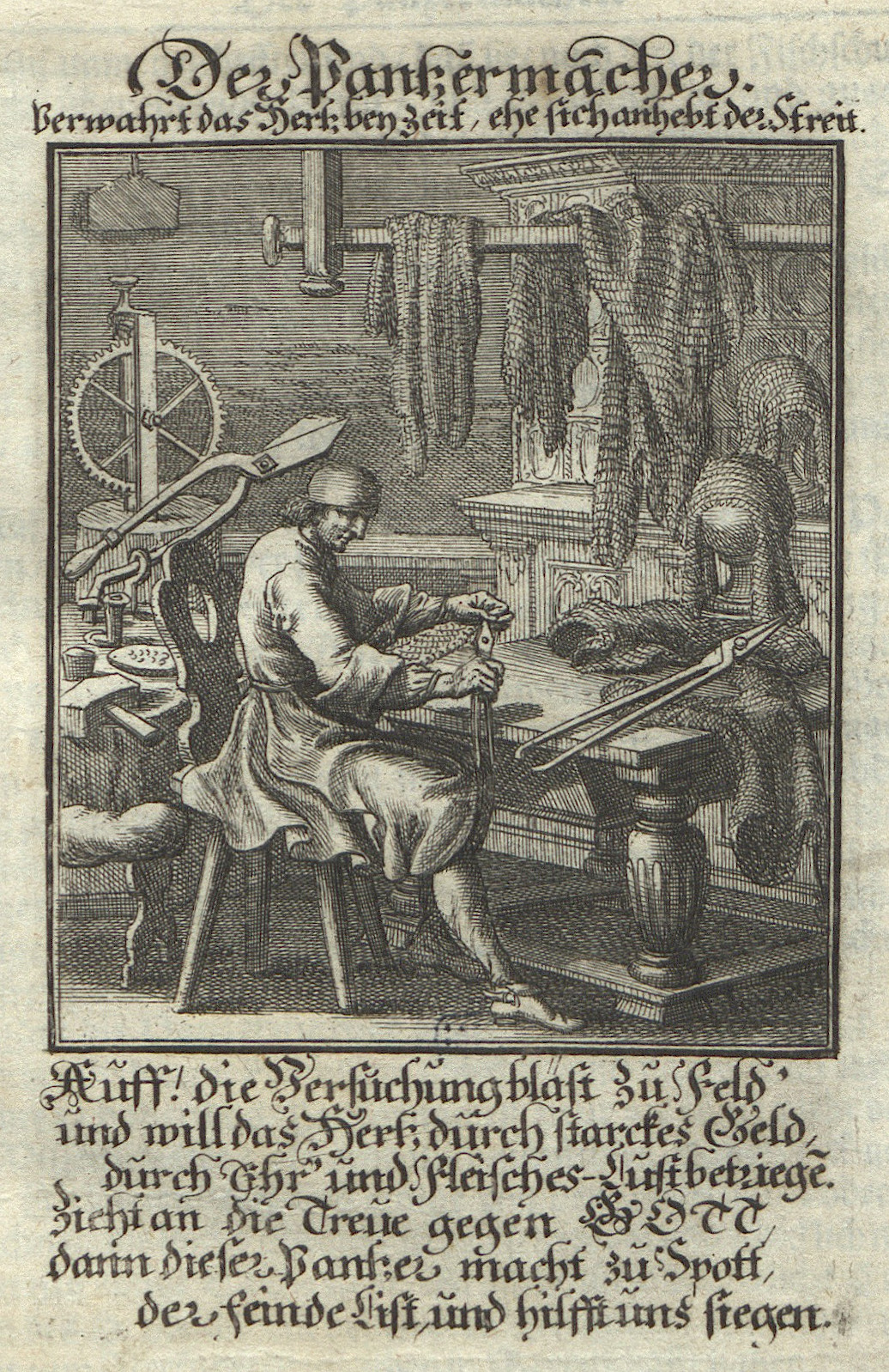
An engraving from 1698 showing the manufacture of mail

Several patterns of linking the rings together have been known since ancient times, with the most common being the 4-to-1 pattern (where each ring is linked with four others). In Europe, the 4-to-1 pattern was completely dominant. Mail was also common in East Asia, primarily Japan, with several more patterns being utilised and an entire nomenclature developing around them.

Historically, in Europe, from the pre-Roman period on, the rings composing a piece of mail would be riveted closed to reduce the chance of the rings splitting open when subjected to a thrusting attack or a hit by an arrow.

Up until the 14th century European mail was made of alternating rows of round riveted rings and solid rings. Sometime during the 14th century European mail makers started to transition from round rivets to wedge-shaped rivets, but continued using alternating rows of solid rings. Eventually European mail makers stopped using solid rings and almost all European mail was made from wedge riveted rings only with no solid rings.

Both were commonly made of wrought iron, but some later pieces were made of heat-treated steel. Wire for the riveted rings was formed by either of two methods. One was to hammer out wrought iron into plates and cut or slit the plates. These thin pieces were then pulled through a draw plate repeatedly until the desired diameter was achieved. Waterwheel-powered drawing mills are pictured in several period manuscripts. Another method was to simply forge down an iron billet into a rod and then proceed to draw it out into wire. The solid links would have been made by punching from a sheet. Guild marks were often stamped on the rings to show their origin and craftsmanship.

Forge welding was also used to create solid links, but there are few possible examples known; the only well-documented example from Europe is that of the camail (mail neck-defence) of the 7th-century Coppergate Helmet found in York. Outside of Europe this practice was more common such as "theta" links from India. Very few examples of historic butted mail have been found, and it is generally accepted that butted mail was never in wide use historically except in Japan, where mail (kusari) was commonly made from butted links. Butted link mail was also used by the Moros of the Philippines in their mail and plate armours.

== Modern uses ==
=== Practical uses ===
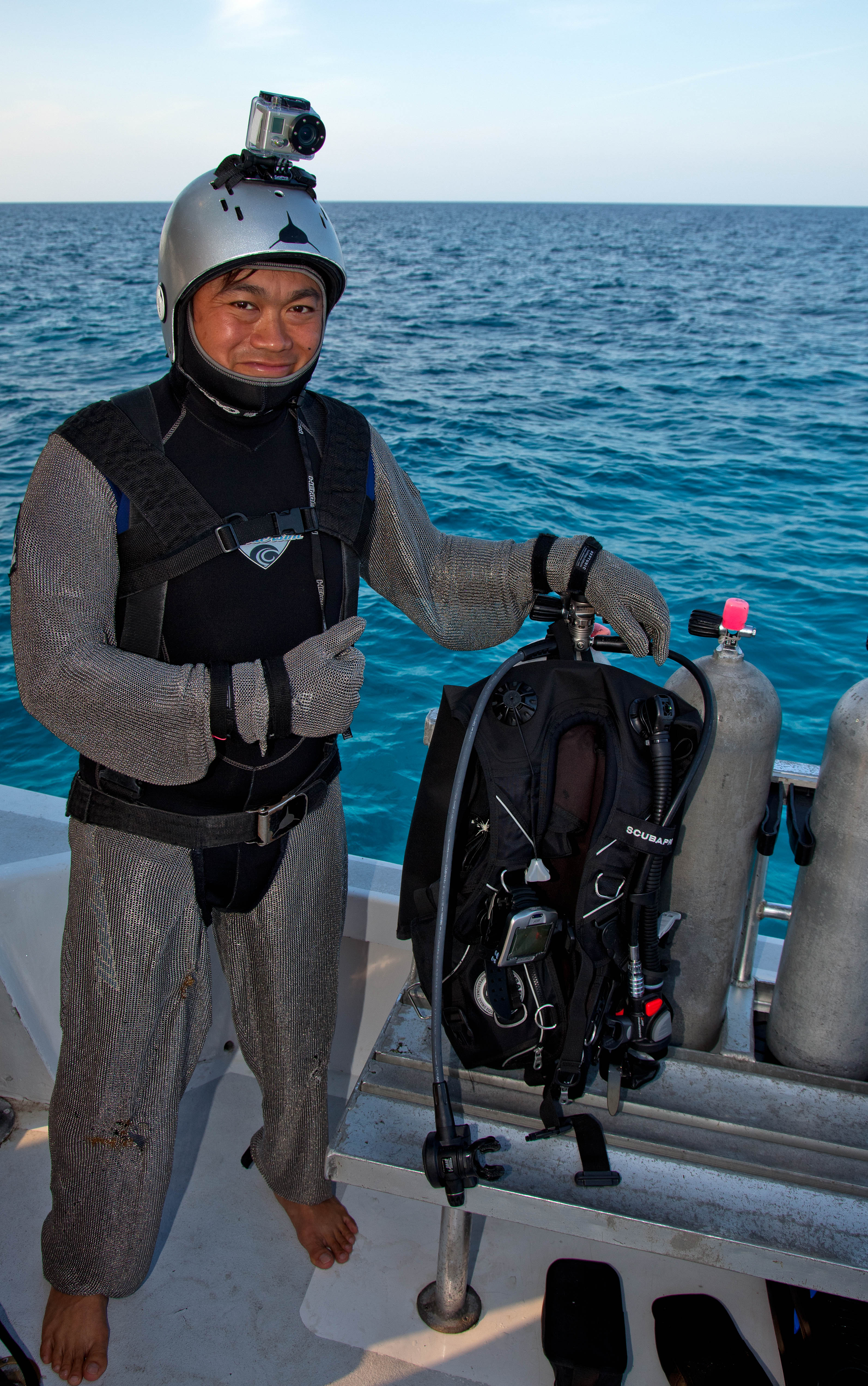
Neptunic shark suit

Mail is used as protective clothing for butchers against meat-packing equipment. Workers may wear up to 4 kg (8.8 lb) of mail under their white coats. Butchers also commonly wear a single mail glove to protect themselves from self-inflicted injury while cutting meat, as do many oyster shuckers.

Scuba divers sometimes use mail to protect them from sharkbite, as do animal control officers for protection against the animals they handle. In 1980, marine biologist Jeremiah Sullivan patented his design for Neptunic full coverage chain mail shark resistant suits which he had developed for close encounters with sharks. Shark expert and underwater filmmaker Valerie Taylor was among the first to develop and test shark suits in 1979 while diving with sharks.

Mail is widely used in industrial settings as shrapnel guards and splash guards in metal working operations.

Electrical applications for mail include RF leakage testing and being worn as a Faraday cage suit by tesla coil enthusiasts and high voltage electrical workers.

==== Stab-proof vests ====
Conventional textile-based ballistic vests are designed to stop soft-nosed bullets but offer little defense from knife attacks. Knife-resistant armour is designed to defend against knife attacks; some of these use layers of metal plates, mail and metallic wires.

=== Historical re-enactment ===
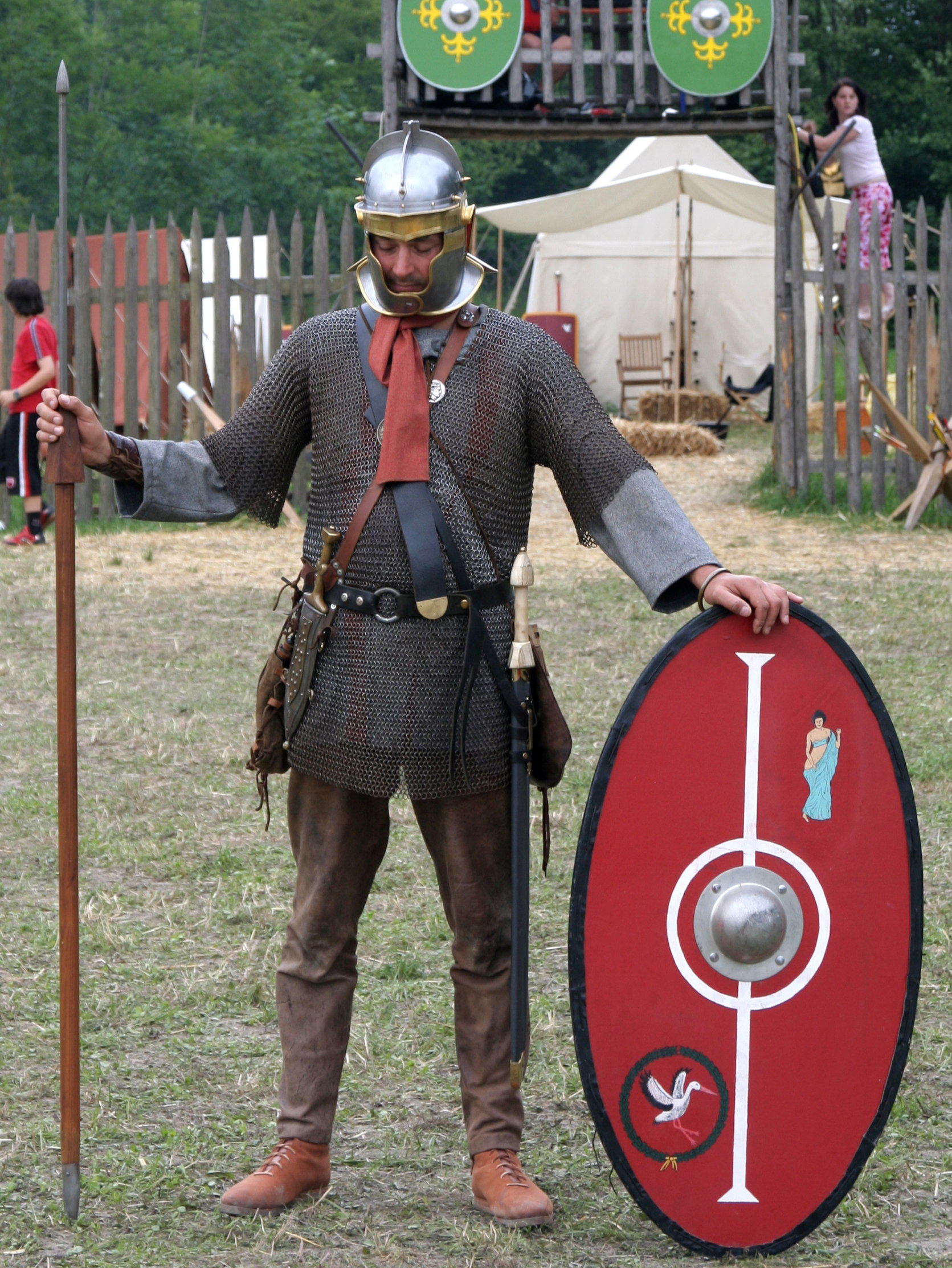
Roman soldier 175 A.D. from a northern province (re-enactment).

Many historical reenactment groups, especially those whose focus is Antiquity or the Middle Ages, commonly use mail both as practical armour and for costuming. Mail is especially popular amongst those groups which use steel weapons.

One of the drawbacks of mail is the uneven weight distribution; the stress falls mainly on shoulders. Weight can be better distributed by wearing a belt over the mail, which provides another point of support.

Mail worn today for re-enactment and recreational use can be made in a variety of styles and materials. Most recreational mail today is made of butted links, which refers to the way these rings are closed, and are often galvanised or stainless steel. This is historically inaccurate but is much less expensive to procure and especially to maintain than historically accurate reproductions. Mail can also be made of titanium, aluminium, bronze, or copper. Riveted mail offers significantly better protection ability as well as historical accuracy than mail constructed with butted links. Japanese mail (kusari) is one of the few historically correct examples of mail being constructed with such butted links.

=== Decorative uses ===
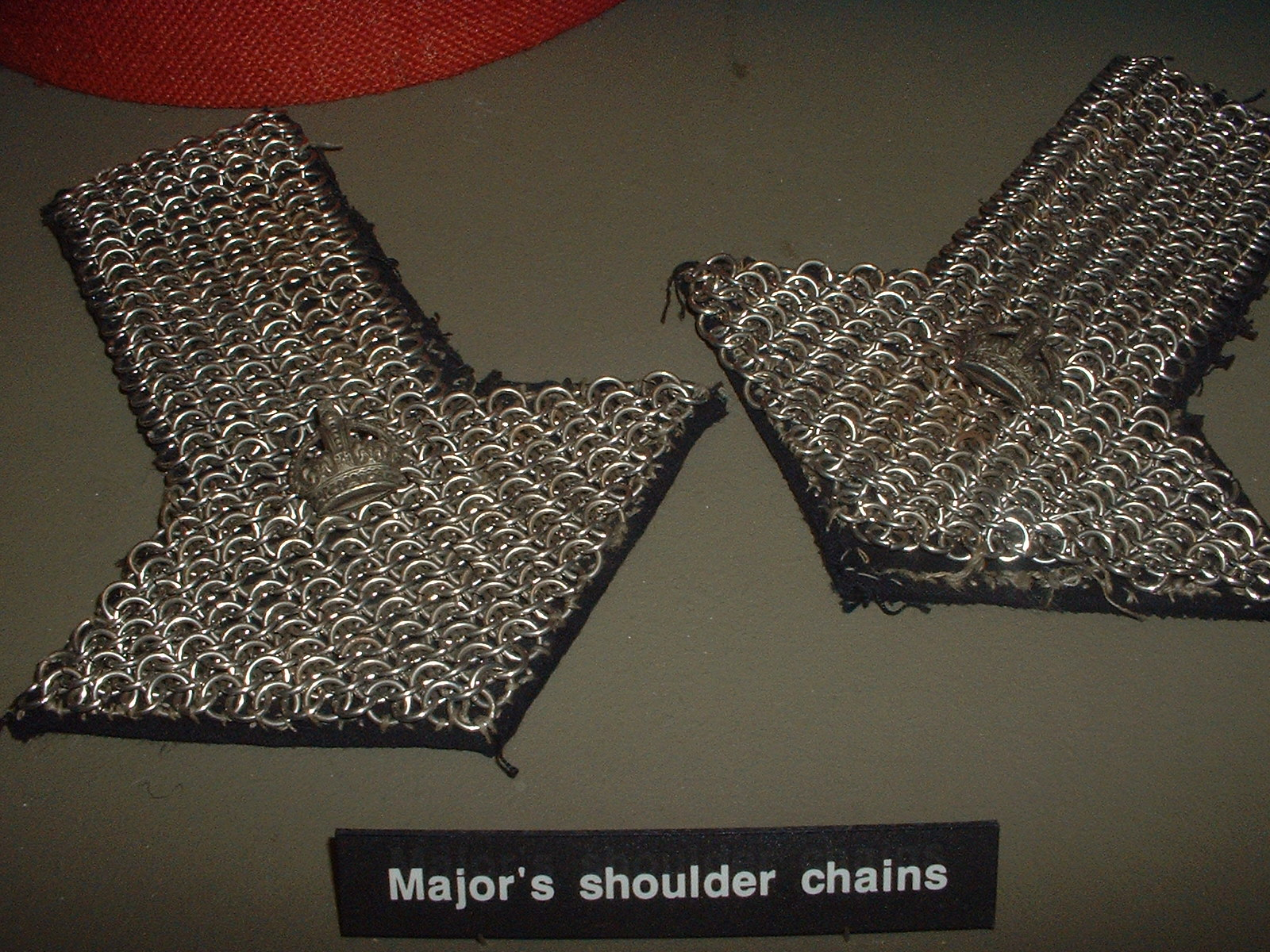
Major's shoulder chains

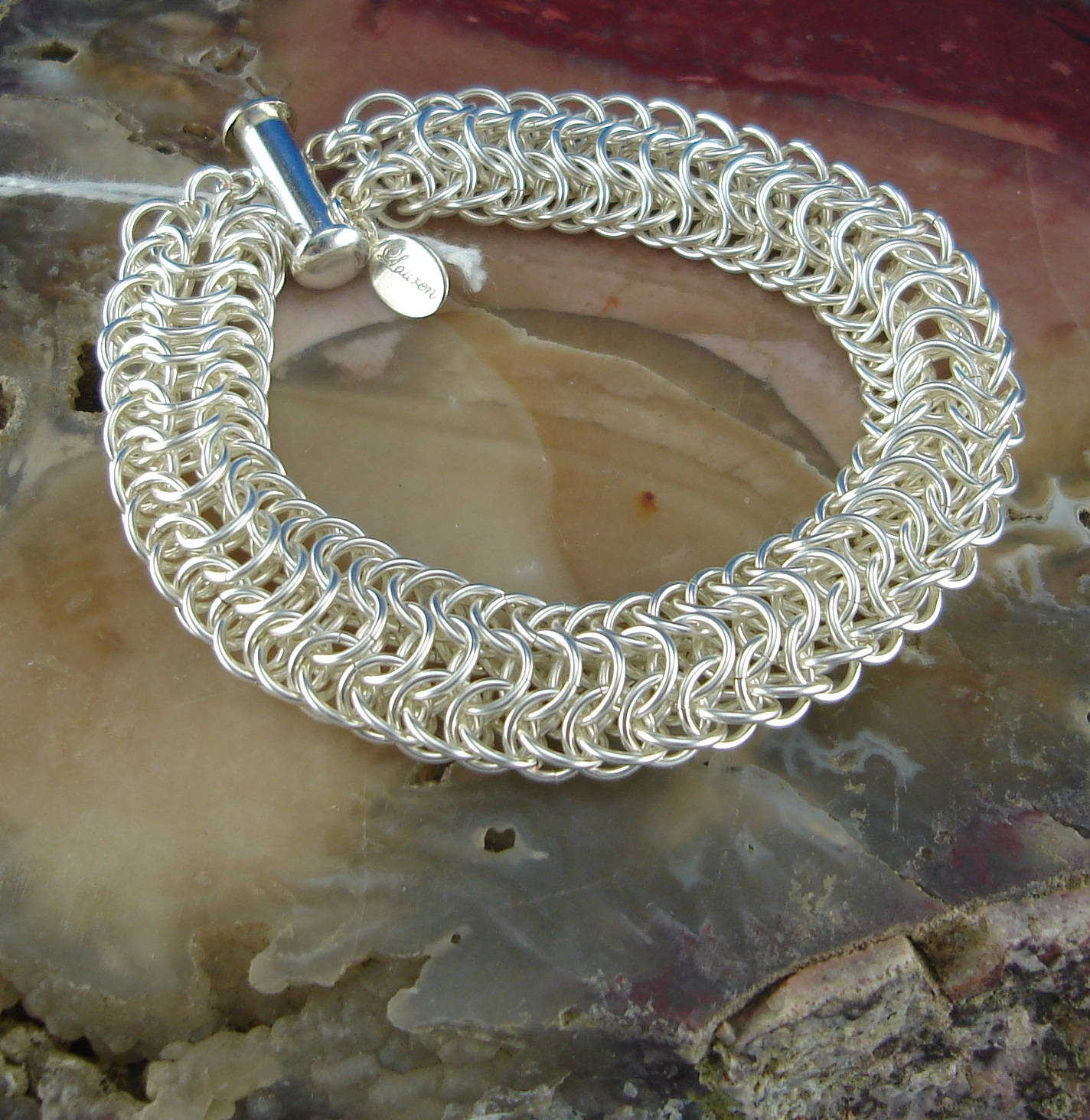
A modern example of the use of mail, a bracelet using the Dragonback Weave

Mail remained in use as a decorative and possibly high-status symbol with military overtones long after its practical usefulness had passed. It was frequently used for the epaulettes of military uniforms. It is still used in this form by some regiments of the British Army.

Mail has applications in sculpture and jewellery, especially when made out of precious metals or colourful anodized metals. Mail artwork includes headdresses, decorative wall hangings, ornaments, chess sets, macramé, and jewelry. For these non-traditional applications, hundreds of patterns (commonly referred to as "weaves") have been invented.

Large-linked mail is occasionally used as BDSM clothing material, with the large links intended for fetishistic purposes.

== In popular culture ==
=== Video games ===
Chainmail armor can be found in multiple games, such as Elden Ring and Minecraft. It is typically depicted as less expensive than plate armor, with the tradeoff being an inferior defense. Chainmail may also be purely cosmetic and hold no gameplay advantage.

=== Film ===
In some films, knitted string spray-painted with a metallic paint is used instead of actual mail in order to cut down on cost (an example being Monty Python and the Holy Grail, which was filmed on a very small budget). Films more dedicated to costume accuracy often use ABS plastic rings, for the lower cost and weight. Such ABS mail coats were made for The Lord of the Rings film trilogy, in addition to many metal coats. The metal coats are used rarely because of their weight, except in close-up filming where the appearance of ABS rings is distinguishable. A large scale example of the ABS mail used in the Lord of the Rings can be seen in the entrance to the Royal Armouries museum in Leeds in the form of a large curtain bearing the logo of the museum. It was acquired from the makers of the film's armour, Weta Workshop, when the museum hosted an exhibition of WETA armour from their films. For the film Mad Max Beyond Thunderdome, Tina Turner is said to have worn actual mail and she complained how heavy this was. Game of Thrones makes use of mail, notably during the "Red Wedding" scene.

== Gallery ==
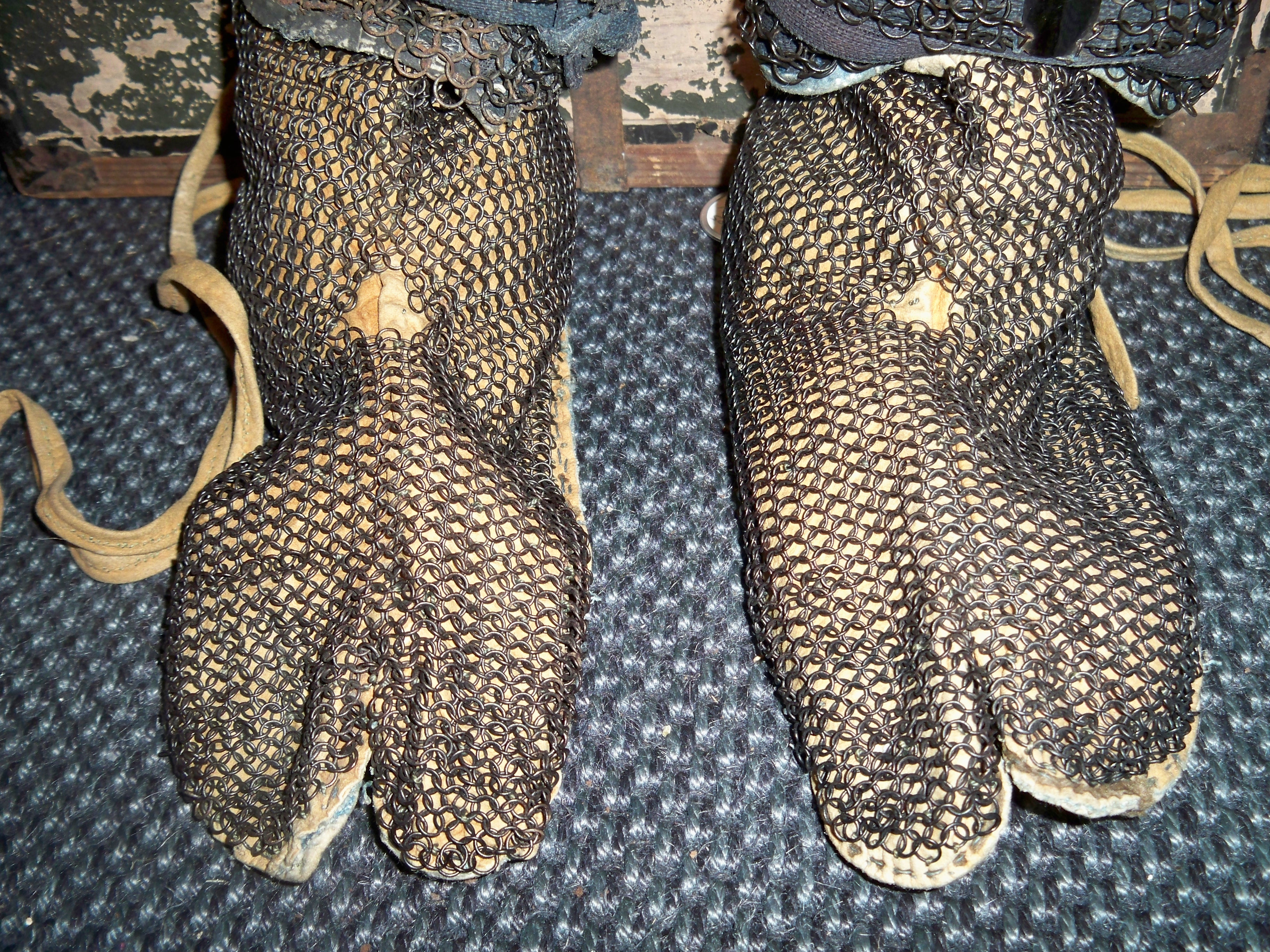
Edo period 1800s Japanese (samurai) mail socks or kusari tabi, butted rings.

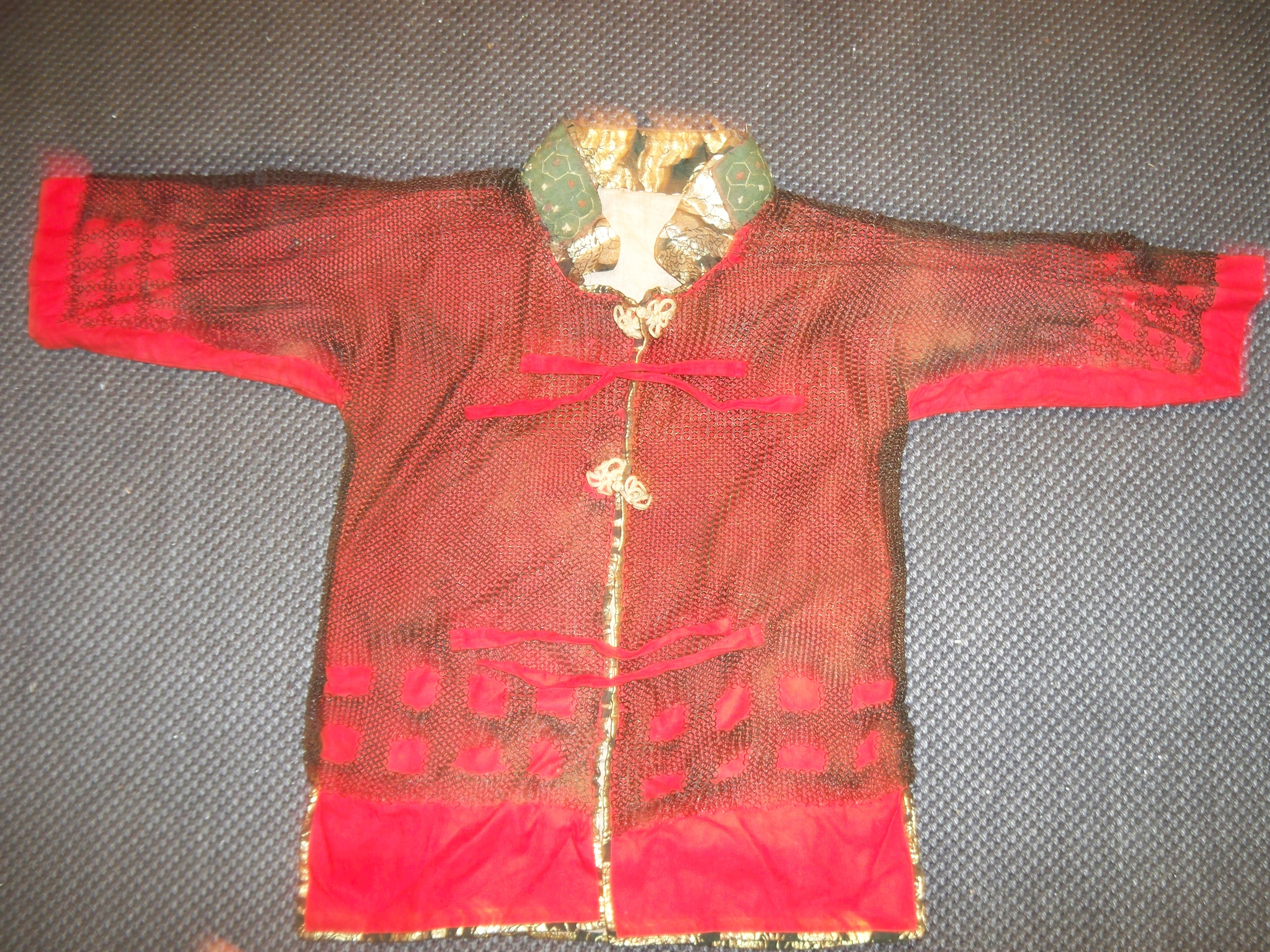
Japanese Edo period mail jacket, butted rings kusari katabira.

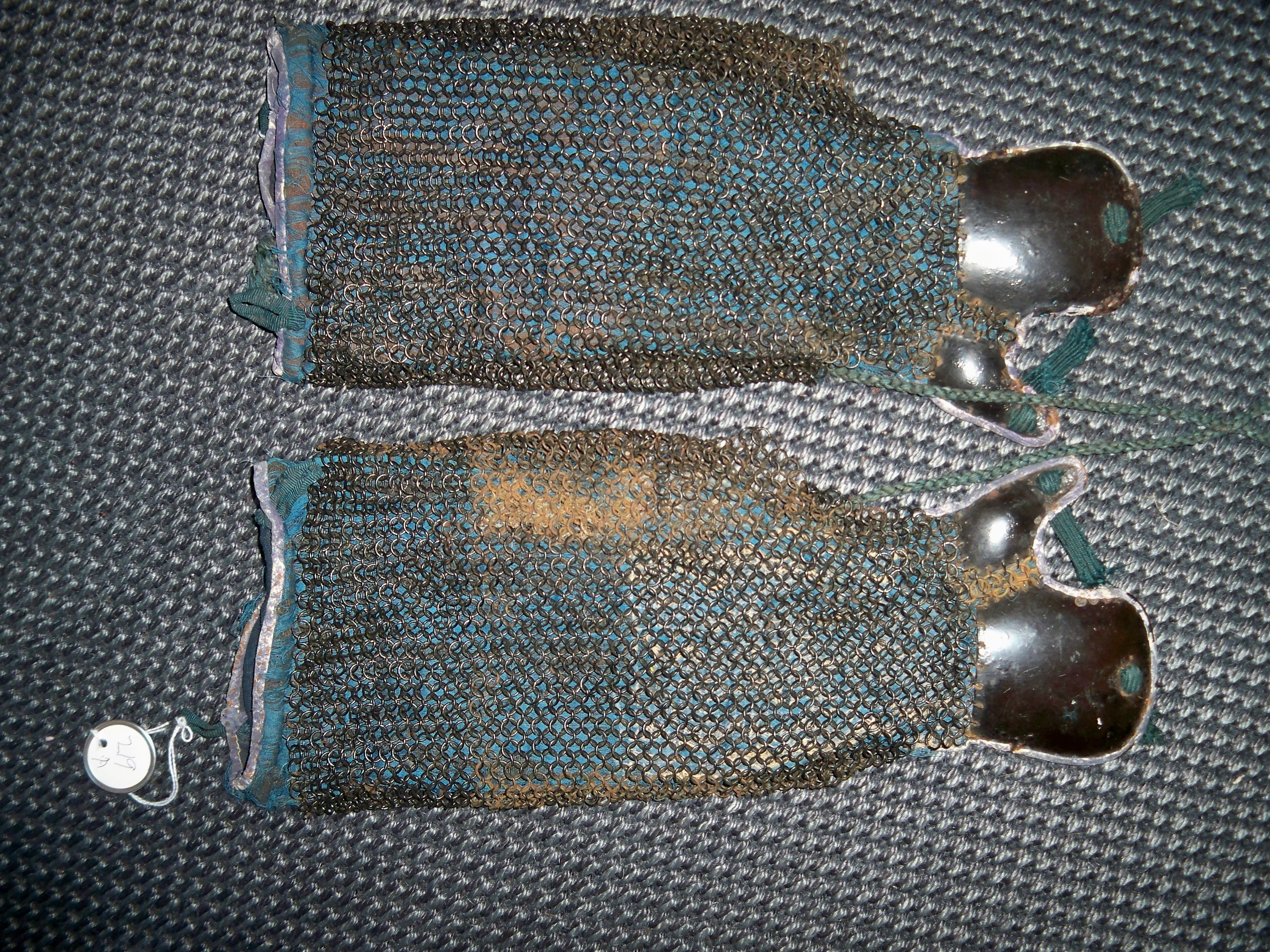
Edo period Japanese (samurai) mail gauntlets kusari han kote, butted rings.

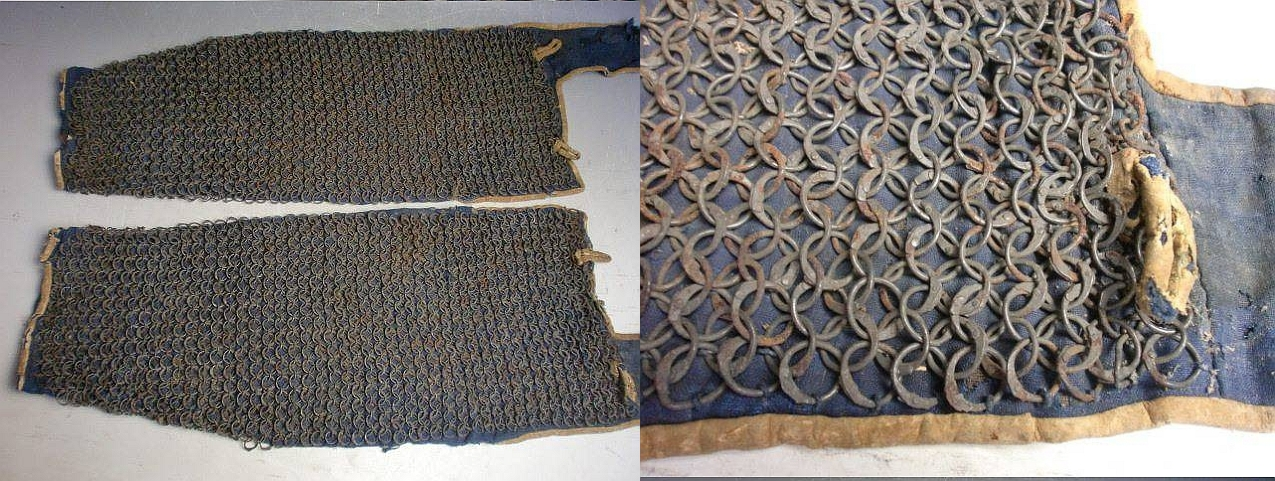
A rare example of Japanese riveted mail, round riveted rings.

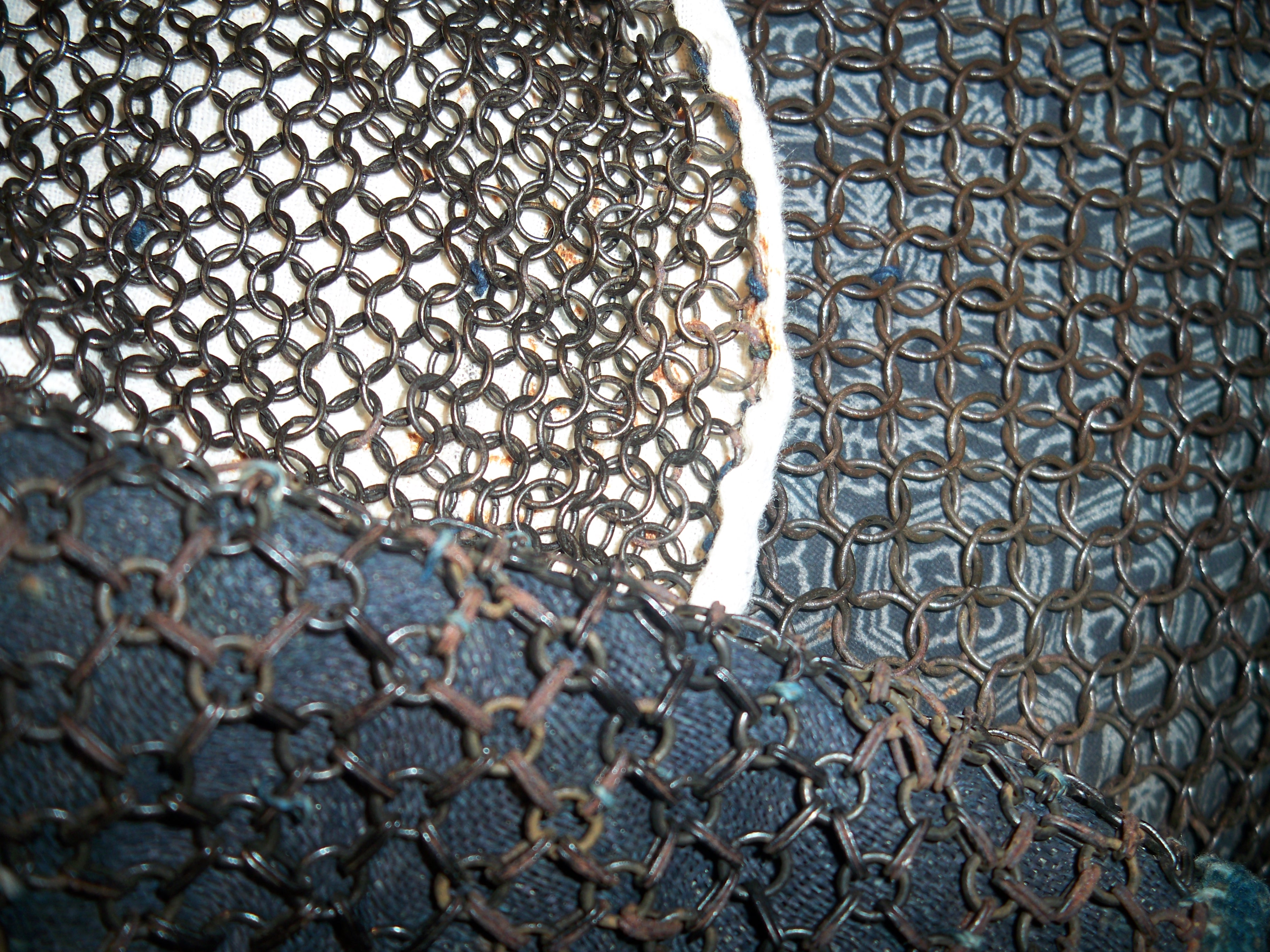
Examples of Edo period Japanese (samurai) mail kusari.

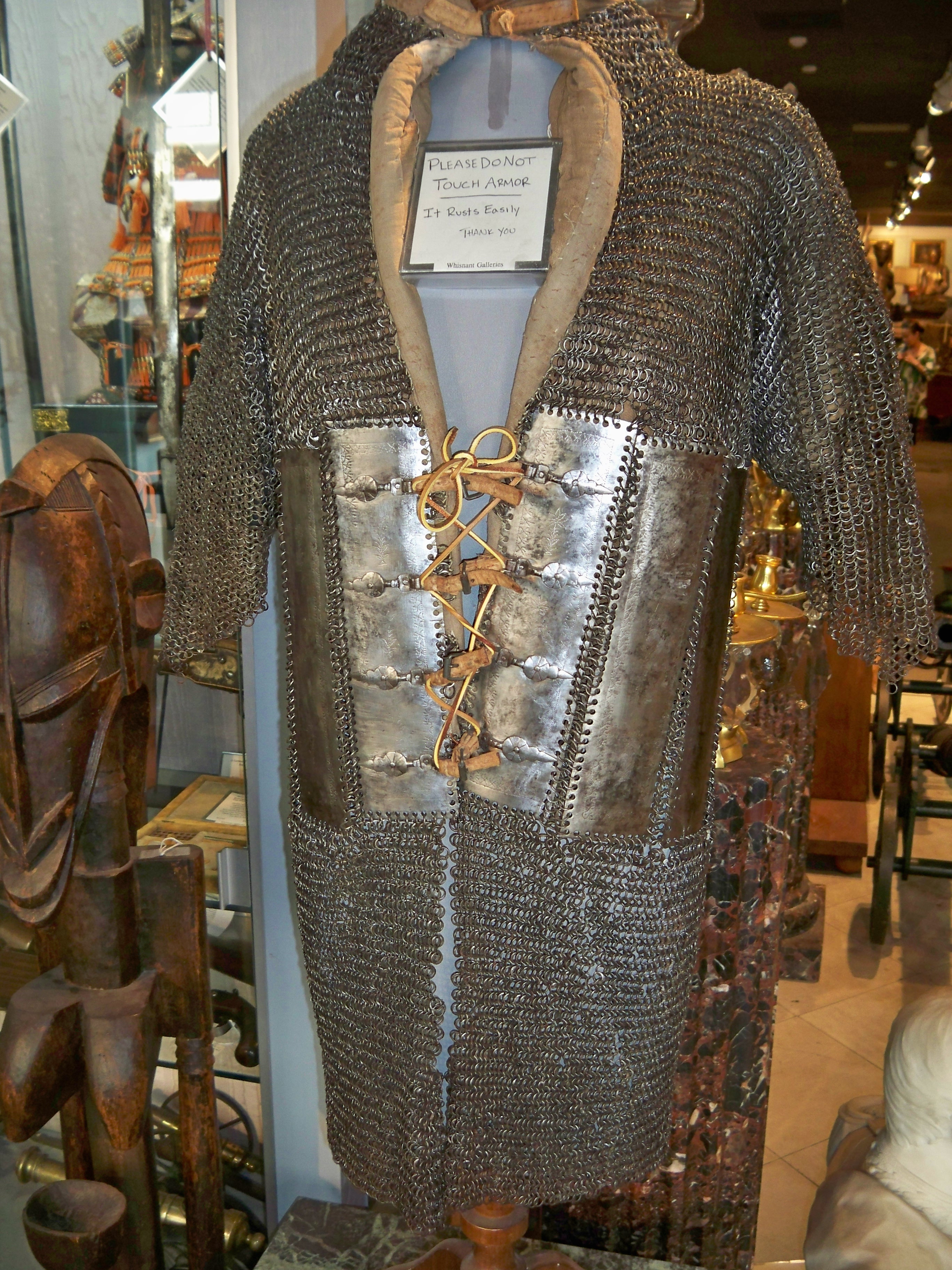
Riveted mail and plate coat zirah bagtar. Armour of this type was introduced into India under the Mughals.

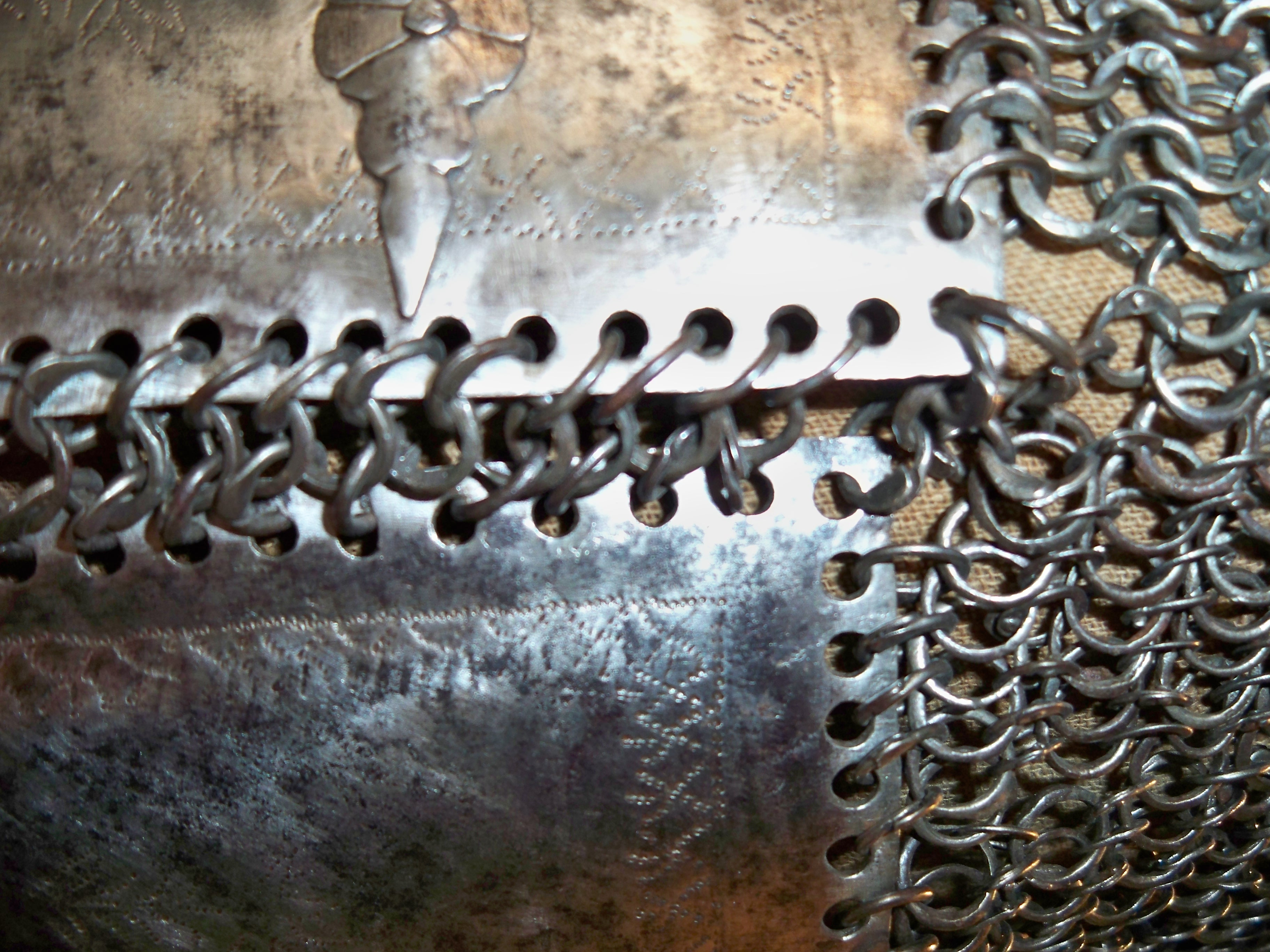
Close up of Mughal riveted mail and plate coat zirah Bagtar, 17th century, alternating rows of solid rings and round riveted rings.

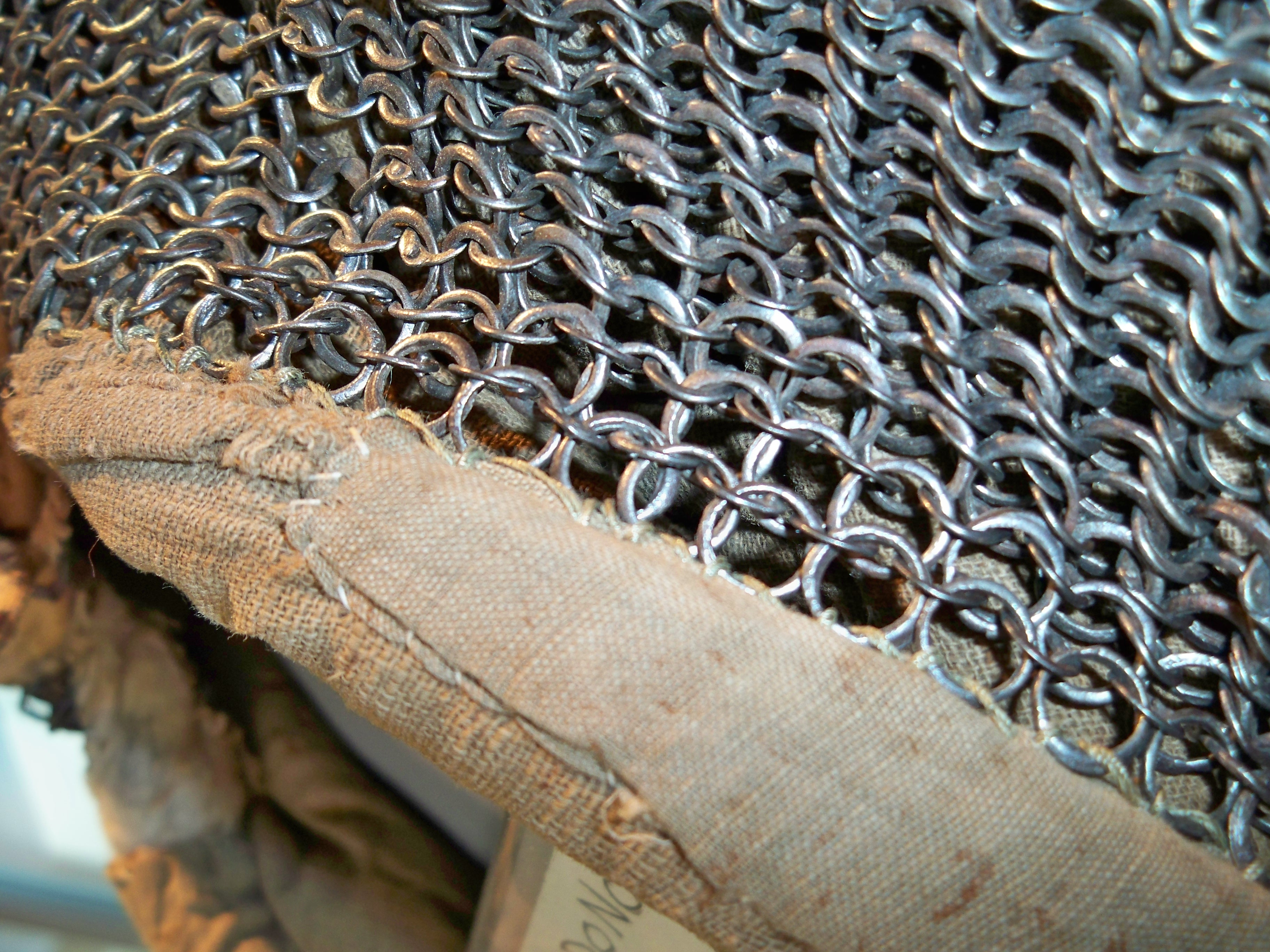
Close up detail of Mughal riveted mail hood kulah zirah, 17th century, alternating rows of round riveted rings and solid rings.

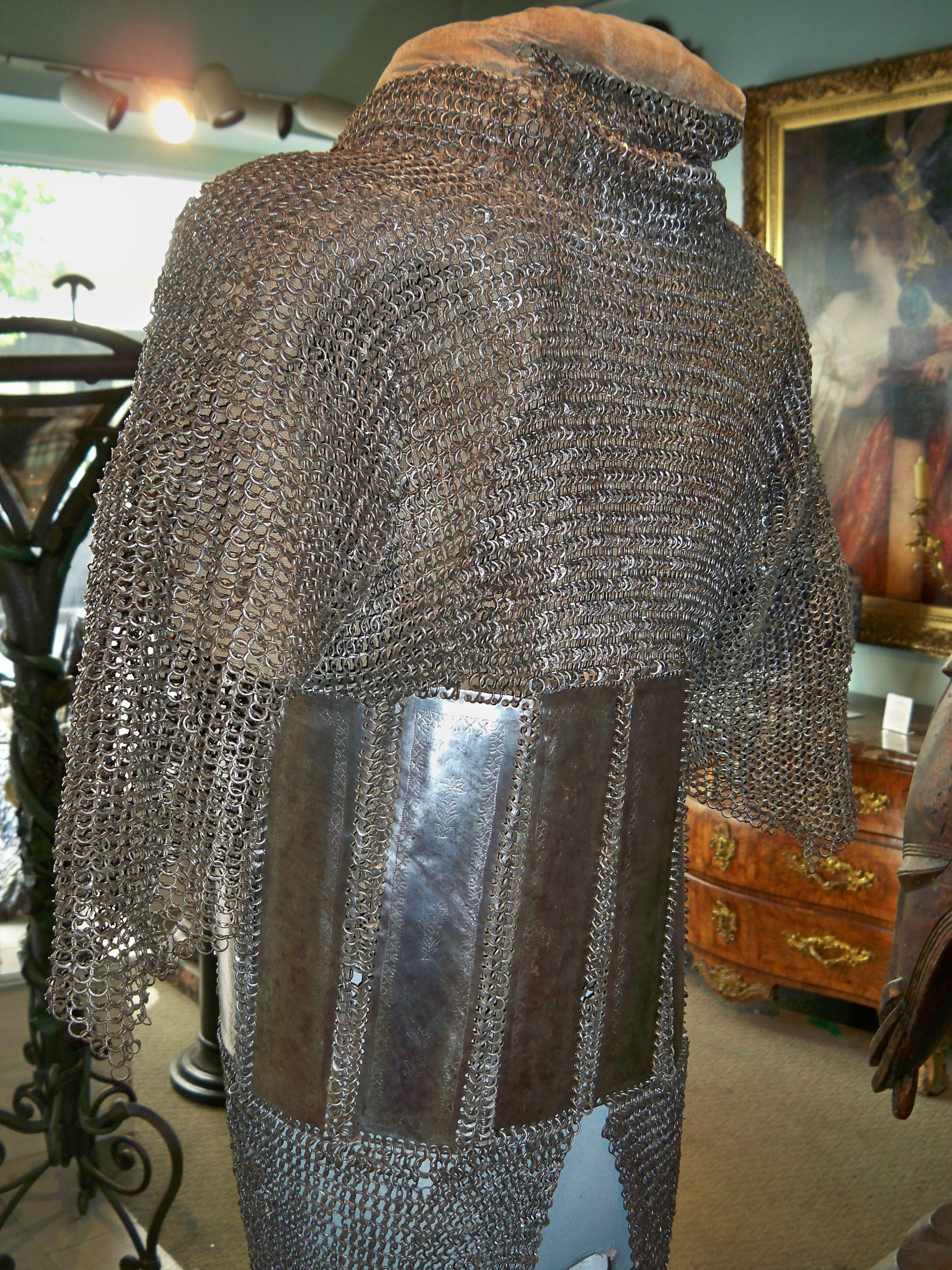
Mughal riveted mail and plate coat zirah Bagtar, 17th century, alternating rows of round riveted rings and solid rings.

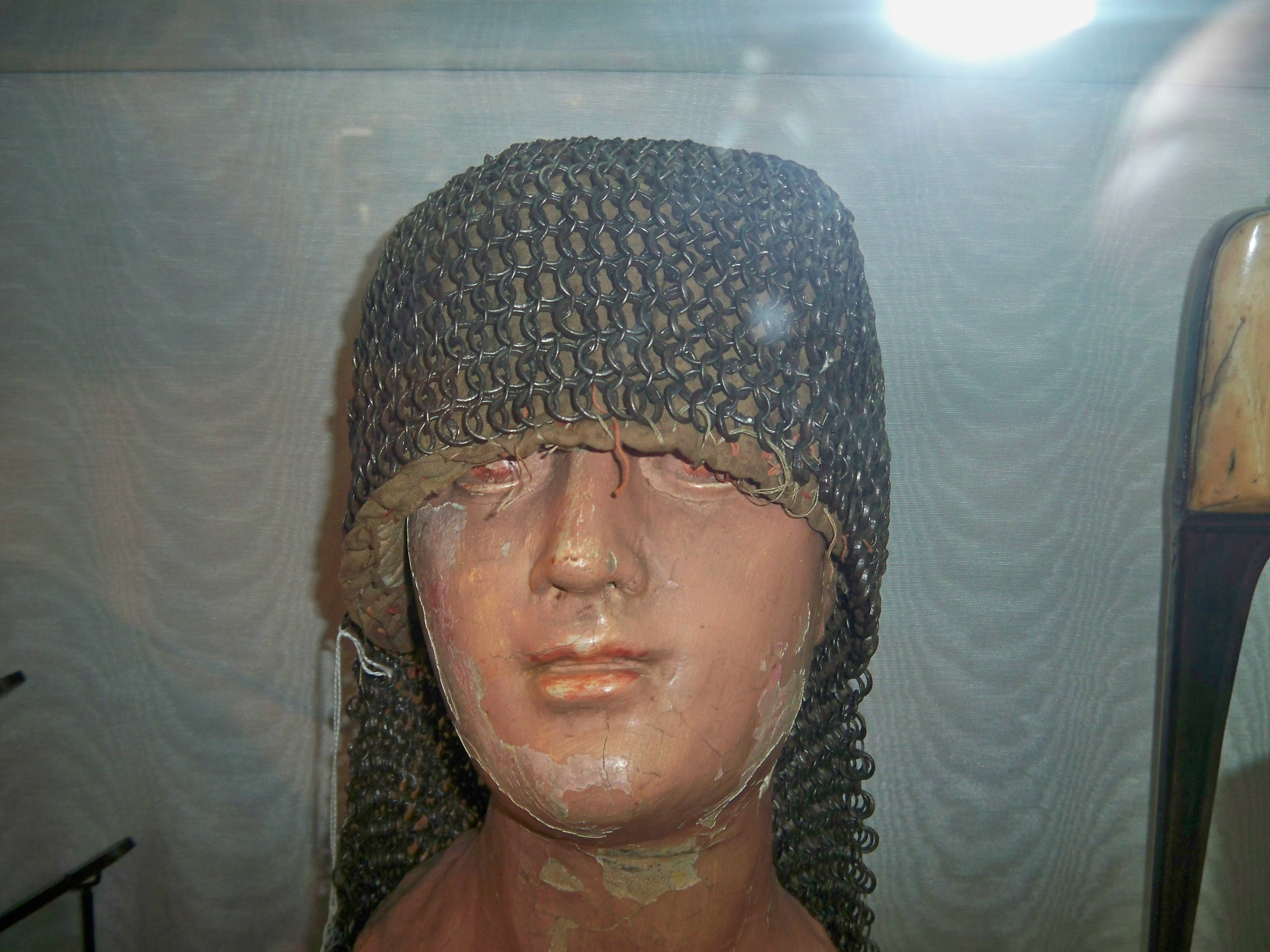
Mughal riveted mail hood kulah zirah. 17th century, alternating rows of round riveted rings and solid rings.

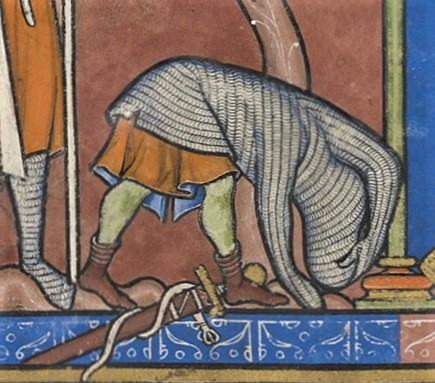
"David rejects the unaccustomed armour" (detail of fol. 28r of the 13th century Morgan Bible). The image depicts a method of removing a hauberk.

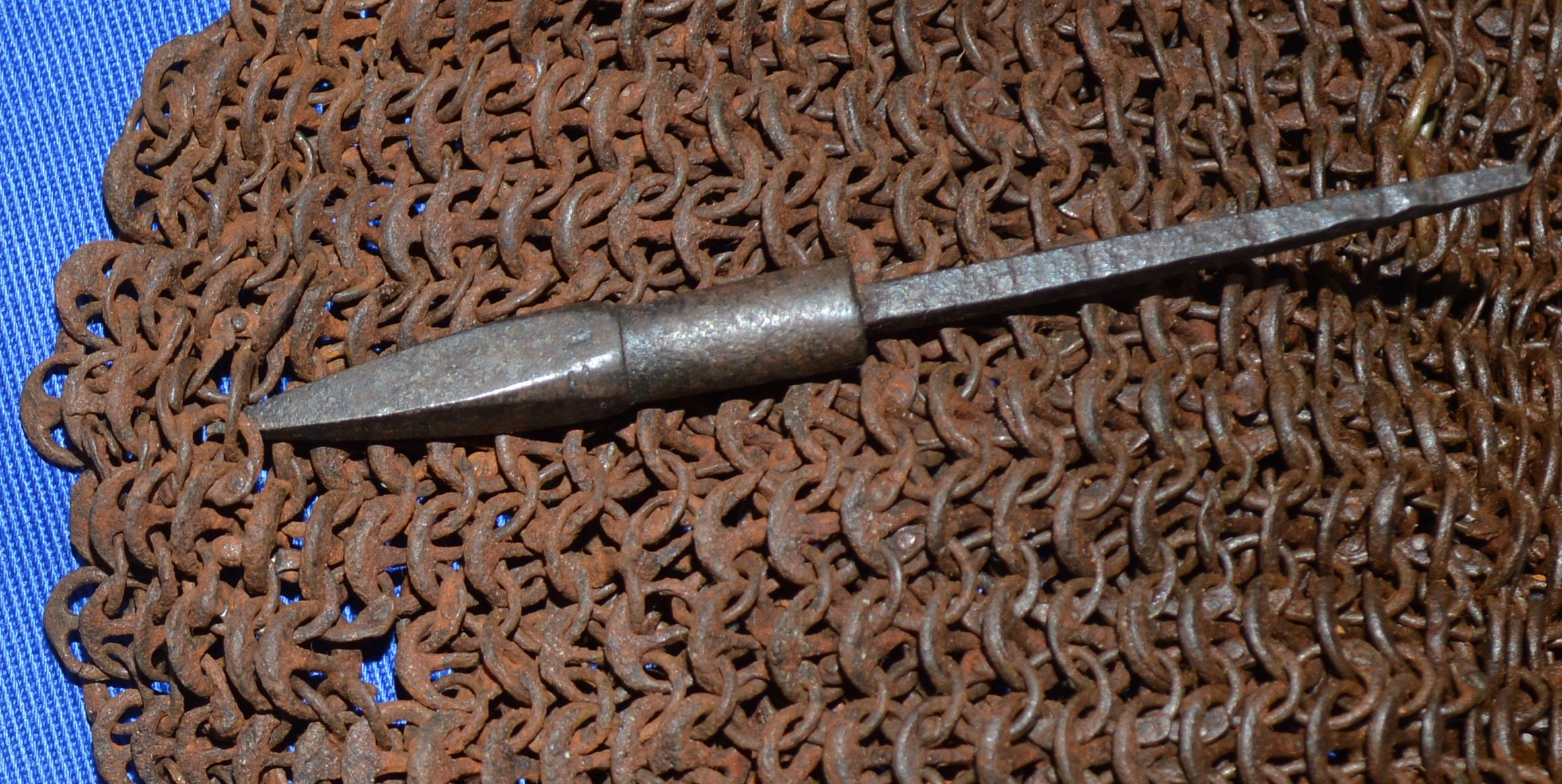
Indian theta link mail (bar link mail), alternating rows of solid theta rings and round riveted rings, 17th century.

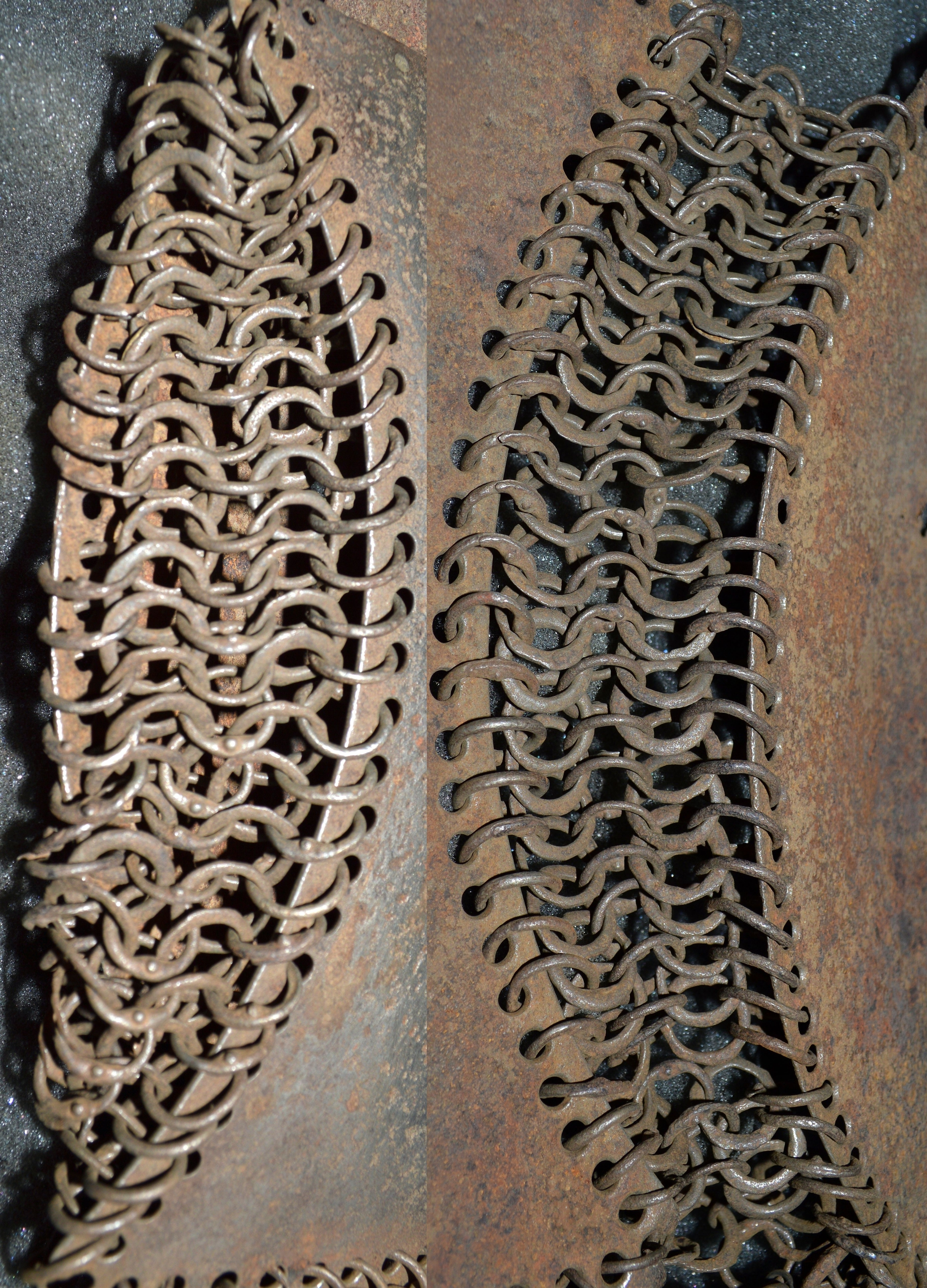
Ottoman riveted mail, alternating rows of round riveted links and solid links, 16th century.

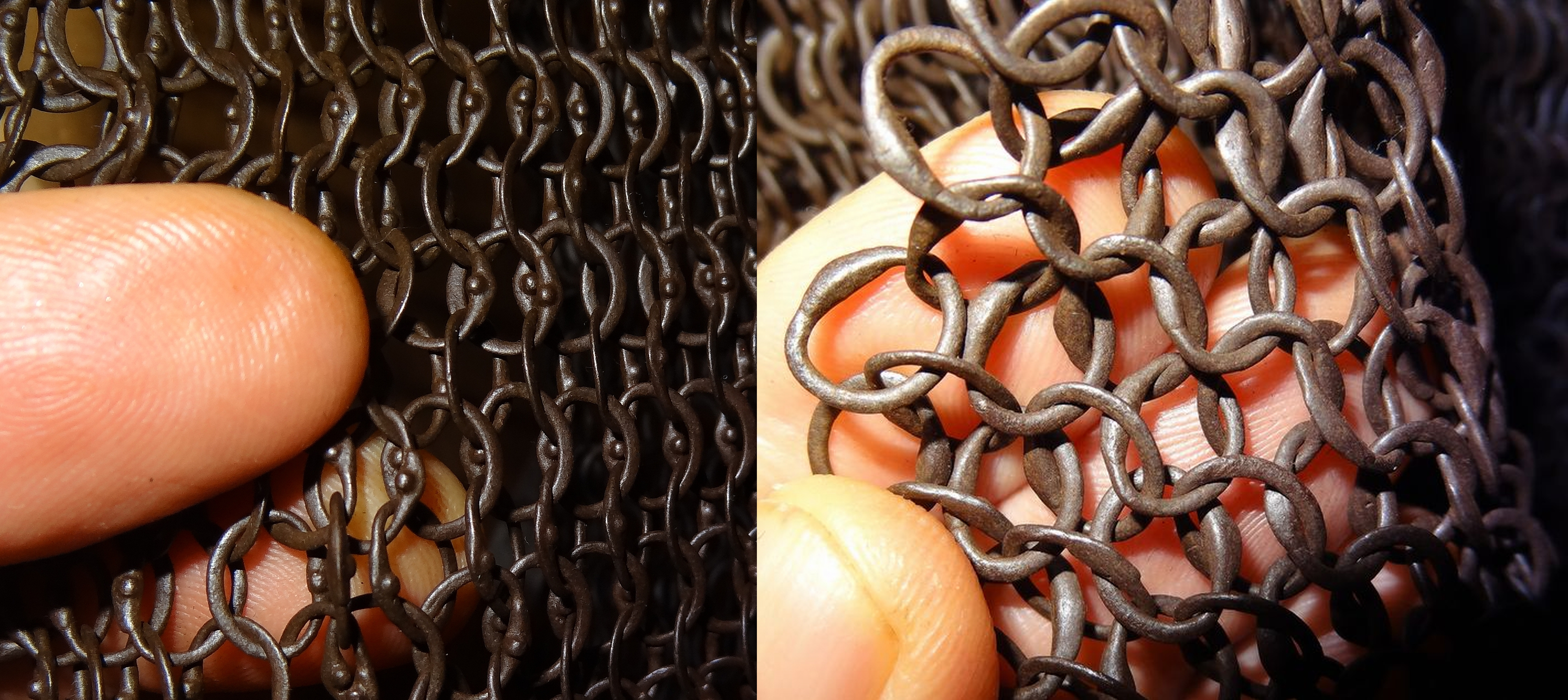
European wedge riveted mail, showing both sides of the rings, 16th to 17th century.

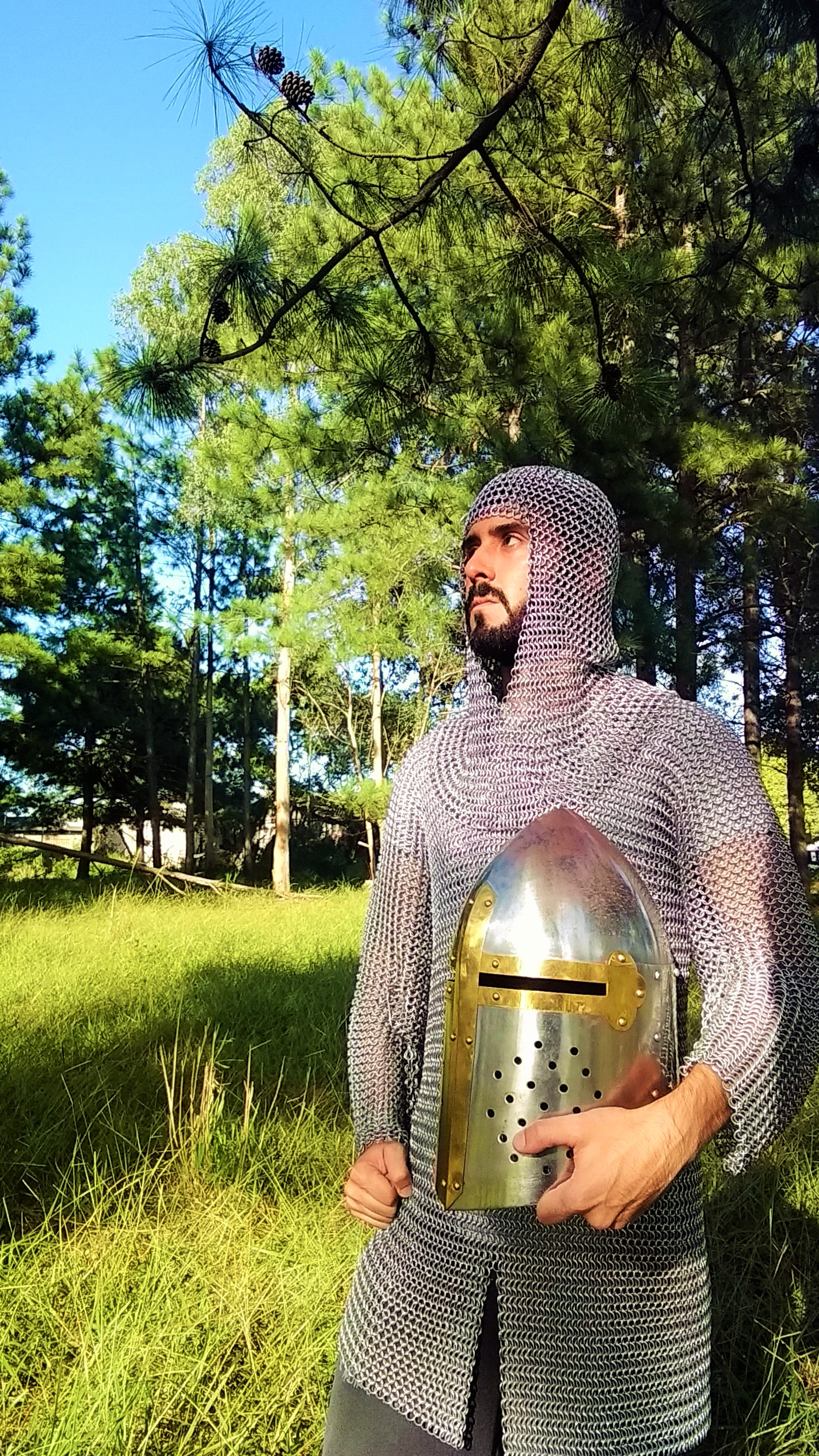
Man wearing mail in modern days.

== See also ==
=== Mail-based armour ===
- Banded mail
- Hauberk
- Mail and plate armour
- Kusari (Japanese mail armour)
- Lorica hamata
- Lorica plumata with scales attached to a backing of mail
- Tatami (Japanese armour)
- Baju Rantai, type of mail from the Nusantara archipelago

=== Armour supplementary to mail ===
Typically worn under mail armour if thin or over mail armour if thick:

- Gambeson (also known as quilted armour or a padded jack)

Can be worn over mail armour:

- Brigandine
- Coat of plates
- Lamellar armour
- Mirror armour (supplementary plates worn over mail)
- Scale armour
- Splint armour
- Transitional armour

Others:

- Cataphract
- Proofing (armour)
- Ring armour
