= Ring armour =

Conjectured medieval armour type

Supposed examples of early armour construction from 1902. The lower right section is an example of ring armour.

Ring armour (ring mail) is an assumed type of personal armour constructed as series of metallic rings sewn to a fabric or leather foundation. No actual examples of this type of armour are known from collections or archaeological excavations in Europe. It is sometimes called ringmail or ring mail. In the Victorian era the term "mail" was used fancifully for any form of metallic body armour. Modern historians reserve the term "mail" for armour formed of an interlinked mesh of metal rings.

The Bayeux Tapestry has been misinterpreted as depicting several different types of armour. It is generally acknowledged today that virtually all the armour on the tapestry is standard mail armour and not "ring mail", "trellised mail" or "mascled mail" or any other Victorian misinterpretation.

== Theoretical construction ==
Ring armour was believed to be a leather or textile item of clothing (a jacket, or trousers) with a large number of metal rings sewn or tied directly into the foundation garment. Unlike mail armour, the rings are not physically interlocked with each other.

== Schiessjoppe (eyelet doublet) ==
It has been claimed that the garment called eyelet doublet is not a form of ring armour, but an undergarment intended to be used under actual armour. The eyelets are intended as ventilation holes. It was known as a Schiessjoppe in Germany. However, Sir John Smythe, in 1591, recommended that, "Archers should weare either Ilet holed doublets that will resist the thrust of a sword or a dagger and covered with some trim and gallant kinde of coloured cloth to the liking of the captain ... or else Iackes of maile quilted upon fustian." It is clear from this that Smythe's "eyelet holed doublet" was not intended to be worn with mail but as a standalone armour, but this quote from the book titled "The Armourer and His Craft" By Charles John Ffoulkes brings into doubt whether the eyelet doublet was related to ring armour at all.

From the nature of their composition these "eyelet doublets" are rarely to be met with. They were made of twine or thread knitted all over in eyelets or button-holes. The appearance is much the same as modern "tatting" and macramé work.
