= Etruscan military history =

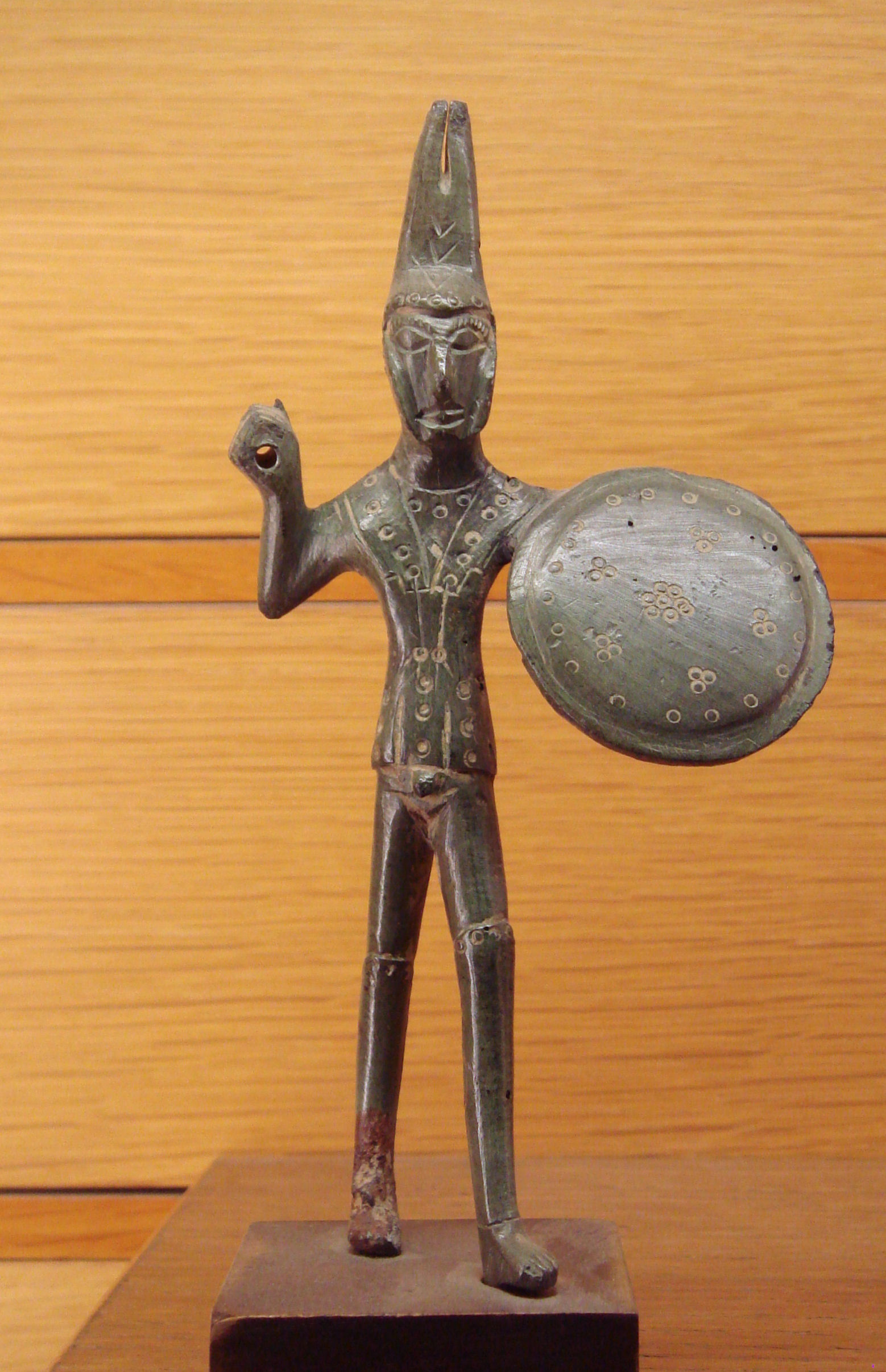
Etruscan warrior, found near Viterbo, Italy, dated circa 500 BC.

Like their contemporaries in Ancient Greece and Ancient Rome, the Etruscans had a persistent military tradition. Warfare served as a marker of status in Etruscan culture and greatly aided the Etruscan economy with new lands, resources, and enslaved workers. The Etruscans organized their military around the power of aristocratic clans, or gens, whose enslaved dependents made up the bulk of their fighting force. They adapted Greek military technology to fit their own needs along with developing their own equipment and tactics using their extensive natural resources.

The Etruscans fought mainly as disconnected cities and clans, vying for power with other local governments and occasionally working together to fight larger local nations like Rome. As their military adapted through the years, it slowly became more Romanized until, after several defeats, they were fully conquered by the Romans around the middle of the 3rd century BC. These individual units would often work together to defeat a common enemy, but there was also infighting between Etruscan clans. Warfare primarily acted as a way to acquire land, prestige goods, prisoners, and to settle feuds within Etruscan society and with other nations.

== Military structure and methods ==
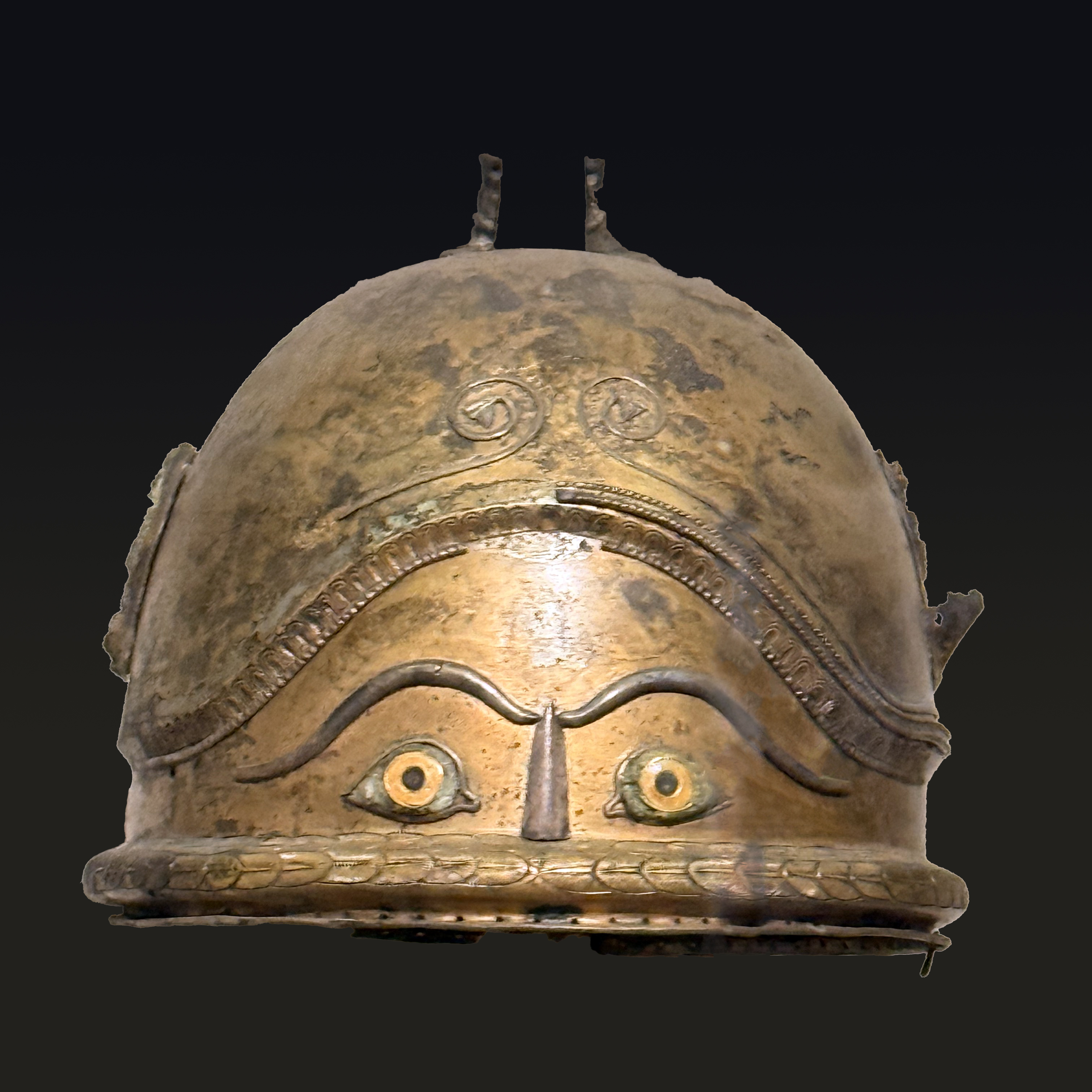
Richly decorated Etruscan helmet from the Tomb of the Warrior in Lanuvium.

=== Fighting style ===
Etruscan armies consisted of two distinctive elements, the elite aristocrats who acted as cavalry, scouts, heavily armored generals, archers, and overall commanders, and the penestai, or dependents, of the elites who would be very lightly equipped and acted as basic foot-soldiers. The aristocrats were well trained in fighting as military prowess was a key component of political success in Etruria. While the Etruscans utilized many parts of the Greek hoplite panoply, there is ongoing debate whether they fought in the same phalanx structure. There is some evidence that certain aristocrats would model their armies after Greek hoplites, replacing a polis-citizen dynamic with the elite and their dependents. Instead of a phalanx, other Etruscans typically fought individually with the elites especially practicing monomachia or single-combat. The rigid social structure of Etruscan society also prevented any truly egalitarian Greek phalanx from forming and the Greek-inspired military units that did exist were adapted to fit the more manipular structure of large Etruscan armies. Within the individualized combat more common in Etruria, each band of aristocrats and penestai would operate semi-independently and would fight in loose formation with other loose groups, with each soldier fighting one opponent at a time. There was not a clear organization between aristocratic families and each unit of an army would arrive with very different skill levels, equipment, and styles of leadership, making unified fighting almost impossible. Within individual fighting, combat often obeyed class hierarchy, with the high-ranking aristocrats fighting other elites and their penestai fighting those of the other elites.

The actual structure adopted by each Etruscan army depended heavily on the scope of conflict. In smaller inter-clan conflicts an individualistic organization was used, while in larger wars between cities or with other independent nations, the Etruscans employed a more structured army with some resemblance to Greek hoplites in a phalanx.

=== Defensive strategy ===
Unique among early Italian civilizations, the Etruscans incorporated ranged units such as archers and slingers into the main body of their army much more easily due to its loose structure. Close relationships between elites across cities was also vital for the defense of Etruscan land. When attacked, each clan could call on its dependents along with other aristocrats to bring their own troops, as demonstrated by the Battle of Veii in which the Romans were initially surprised at the size of the Etruscan force. The Etruscans also built defensive fortifications for their settlements, in which sling-bullets have been found. These hilltop fortifications are found most commonly in the south of Etruria as a response to Roman expansion in the area, with northern Etruria relatively unfortified due to less need for constant protection. The fortifications would be placed on many nearby hills to create a visually connected network of protection and surveillance, defending the local resources, land, and roads. In Southern Etruria, the main period of fortress construction is in the late 4th and early 3rd centuries, corresponding to a period of further conflict with Rome, and almost all were abandoned by the early 1st century once Etruria had been fully conquered by Rome.

=== Etruscans in the Roman army ===
Following Roman domination of Etruria, the Etruscans began to contribute soldiers to the Roman army and lower class Etruscan soldiers were generally homogenous with native Roman legionaries. Along with their inclusion into the Roman army, Etruscans adopted Roman military tactics and system of organization. Etruscan aristocrats also started to embrace Greek military style in order to distinguish themselves from the lower-class, Romanized foot-soldiers although this distinction disappeared in the Late Republic as they were absorbed into the iconography of the Roman elites.

According to later Roman authors, the Romans learned to fight with the phalanx formation from the Etruscans and were only able to defeat them through its adoption. The Etruscan military structure was similar to the Roman manipular structure which aided its assimilation with Rome.

== Equipment ==
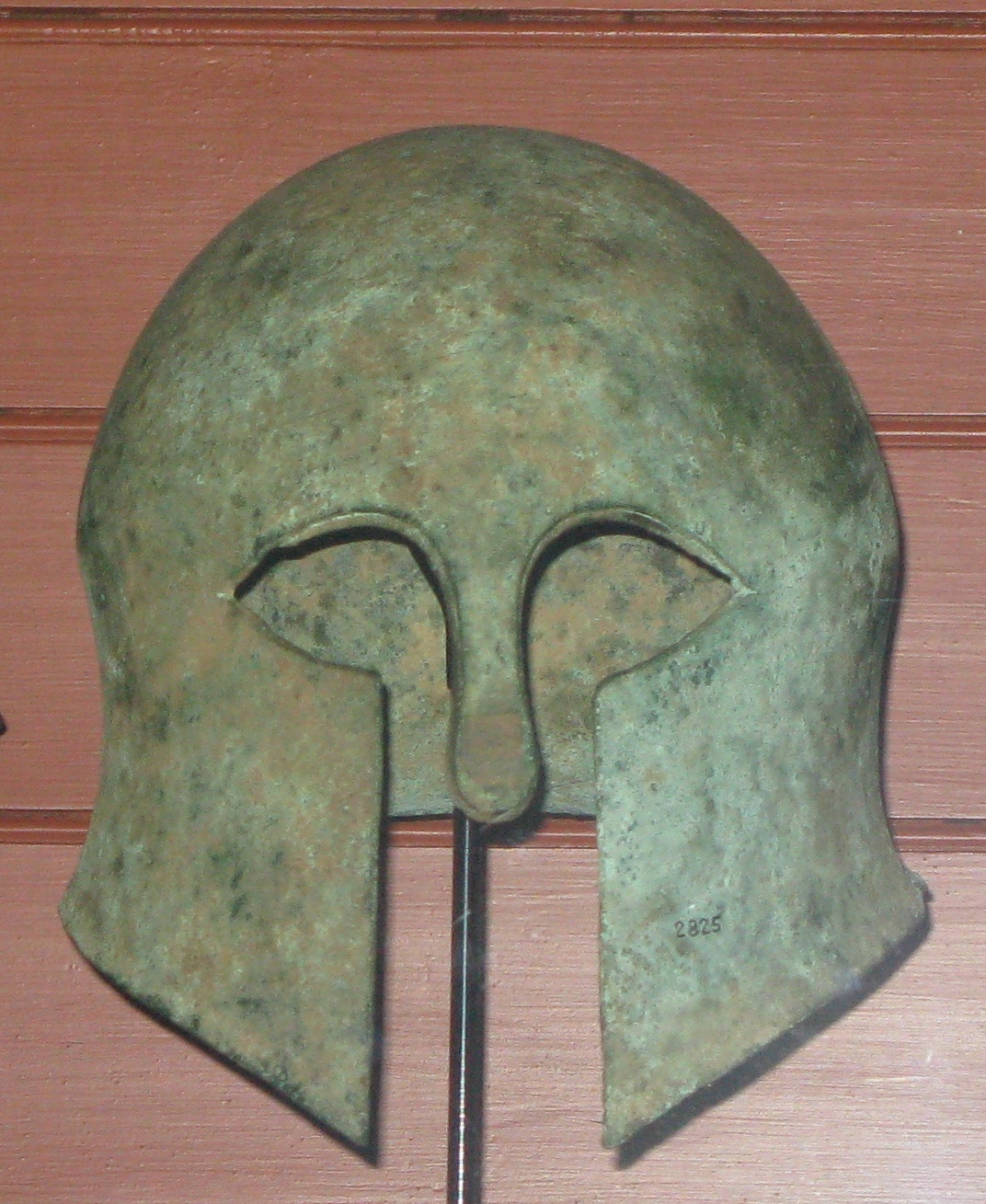
An Etruscan helmet

Both written sources and archaeological finds provide evidence for Etruscan military gear. Etruscan tombs often contain either representations of military equipment or the items themselves. The types of weapons and armor differ based on the time period and location but generally follow similar patterns across Etruria.

Almost all equipment used by Etruscan soldiers would be provided by the city or clan aristocrats who were each responsible for outfitting their own group of dependents. The quality of arms and armor would reflect the status and power of the elite responsible for equipment and were therefore often both higher quality and more elegant so that the elites would seem more important. Often this equipment was marked with the name of the person or family who provided it which further bolstered their renown and assisted with the organization of equipment across larger armies.

=== Iron age (c. 1200 BC – c. 750 BC) ===
During the Iron age the Etruscans began to utilize their vast iron production to develop iron weaponry. They used shorter swords such as the Tarquinian antenna sword along with iron-pointed lances. Defensive equipment was still manufactured from bronze and rectangular plate armor along with crested, knobbed, and capped bronze European helmets was most common. One type shield used was of the Villanovan style, characterized by a round sheet of bronze and a low boss with loops on which rattling pendants would be attached. This shield was more an indication of status and the organic oval scutum was used to greater defensive effect.

=== Orientalizing period (c. 750 BC – c. 600 BC) ===
In the Orientalizing period, Greek hoplite equipment spread throughout Etruria, but it is unclear if this caused a change in the dominant tactics used. In Northern Etruria this new type of kit was almost exclusive to the elites, who were more war-like than their Southern counterparts, and just like other Eastern influences, it became a marker of status across Etruria. The Villanovan shields were fully relegated to the ritual sphere and replaced with the round hoplite shield of the Greeks, although the oval scutum was still used as well. At this point, all weapons were made of iron with shorter daggers and knives used in close-combat while iron Greek-inspired longswords, lances, and socketed axes were used in medium range fighting. Axes also became status symbols, a feature which remained throughout Etruscan history and which influenced later Roman institutions like the fasces.

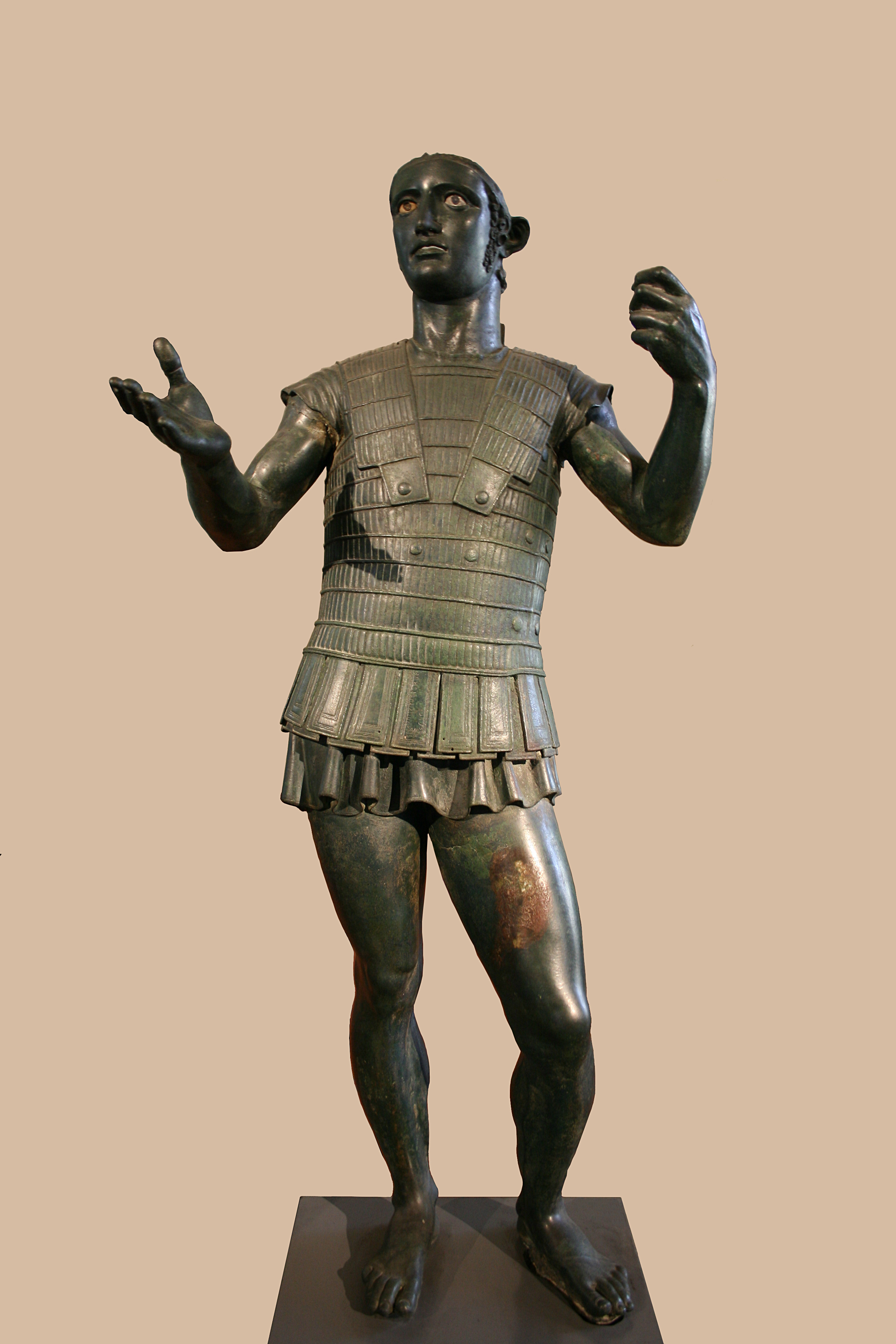
The Mars of Todi, a life-sized bronze sculpture of a soldier making a votive offering, late 5th to early 4th century BC

=== Archaic/Classical period (c. 600 BC – c. 323 BC) ===
The Archaic period saw further development of Etruscan armor, with Etruscan forms of the muscle cuirass, linen cuirass, or disk armor. They continued to use brimmed Etruscan helmets but Greek-style helmets were also prevalent. The single-edged machaira sword was also common. The kopis, which may have originated in Etruria, was used extensively along with a typical kit of an axe, kopis, and javelins which were an early form of the later Roman pila. Greek aspis shields played a large role in Etruscan equipment of this time. In the late 4th century, straight edged swords inspired by those of the Senones and Boii gradually replaced earlier styles and the Veii-produced Negau helmet was swapped for the Gallic Montefortino-type which was cast in the lost wax method.

=== Hellenistic/Republican period (c. 323 BC – c. 27 BC) ===
From the end of the 4th century onwards, Etruscan military equipment shifted closer and closer to Roman models, adopting a more Celtic influenced kit and using the scutum almost exclusively. The primary weapon also switched to the gladius hispaniensis and the Montefortino helmet and mail shirt became the core pieces of armor utilized. Etruscan art at the time embraced Hellenic styles and the elites deliberately maintained Greek equipment to demonstrate their difference in status. The changes in Etruscan kit were expedited by Roman conquest and a hybridity of earlier Etruscan and Republican Roman equipment emerged. The last elements of exclusively Etruscan gear slowly disappeared until the Late Roman Republic at which point the Etruscan military was fully assimilated into Rome.

== Significant battles ==
The written record of the Etruscans is fragmentary, but it is generally believed that the Etruscans vied with the early Romans for control of the central Italian peninsula for nearly two centuries (c. 700-500 BCE) before becoming one of the first neighboring cultures to succumb to Roman expansion.

=== Siege of Rome, 508 BC ===
The Siege of Rome by the Etruscan military against the Roman military

After the expulsion of Lucius Tarquinius Superbus, the king of Clusium, Lars Porsenna attacked Rome on his behalf. He was first repulsed by Publius Horatius Cocles who fought off the Etruscans long enough for a bridge across the Tiber to be destroyed. He then besieged Rome, repeatedly losing men to the Romans, and was almost assassinated by Gaius Mucius, who he later let go and finally ended the siege through a treaty with the Romans which restored lands back to the Etruscans but did not allow Tarquinius Superbus to reclaim his throne.

=== Battle of Cumae, 474 BC ===
After losing to the Cumaeans in 504 BC, the Etruscans attacked with another fleet in 474 BC. Hiero I of Syracuse along with Greek naval forces from southern Italy joined together in the defense of Cumae and defeated the Etruscan fleet in the Bay of Naples. This defeat successfully blocked the southern expansion of Etruscan influence and marked the beginning of their territorial losses in southern Italy.

=== Siege of Veii, 396 BC ===
The end of a long war between the Romans and Veientines, the siege was extended due to the Veientine destruction of Roman siege equipment. The Roman commander Marcus Furius Camillus ordered a tunnel be dug through the soft stone beneath the walls of Veii. He used the size of the Roman army to attack the city all at once to distract from the tunneling efforts. Eventually, the Roman miners reached the inner city and overwhelmed the Veientines. Their defeat gave the Romans their first major foothold into Etruria from which they launched their later conquests.

=== Battle of Populonia, 282 BC ===
At this time, the Etruscans were fighting with the Gauls in revolt against Rome. They fought with the Romans near Populonia in 282 BC. After the Roman victory, Etruscan military dominance of the region declined and they offered little resistance to the Romans later on, allowing for their eventual full conquest around 264 BC.
