= Sakakibara Kozan =

Japanese author (1734–1798)

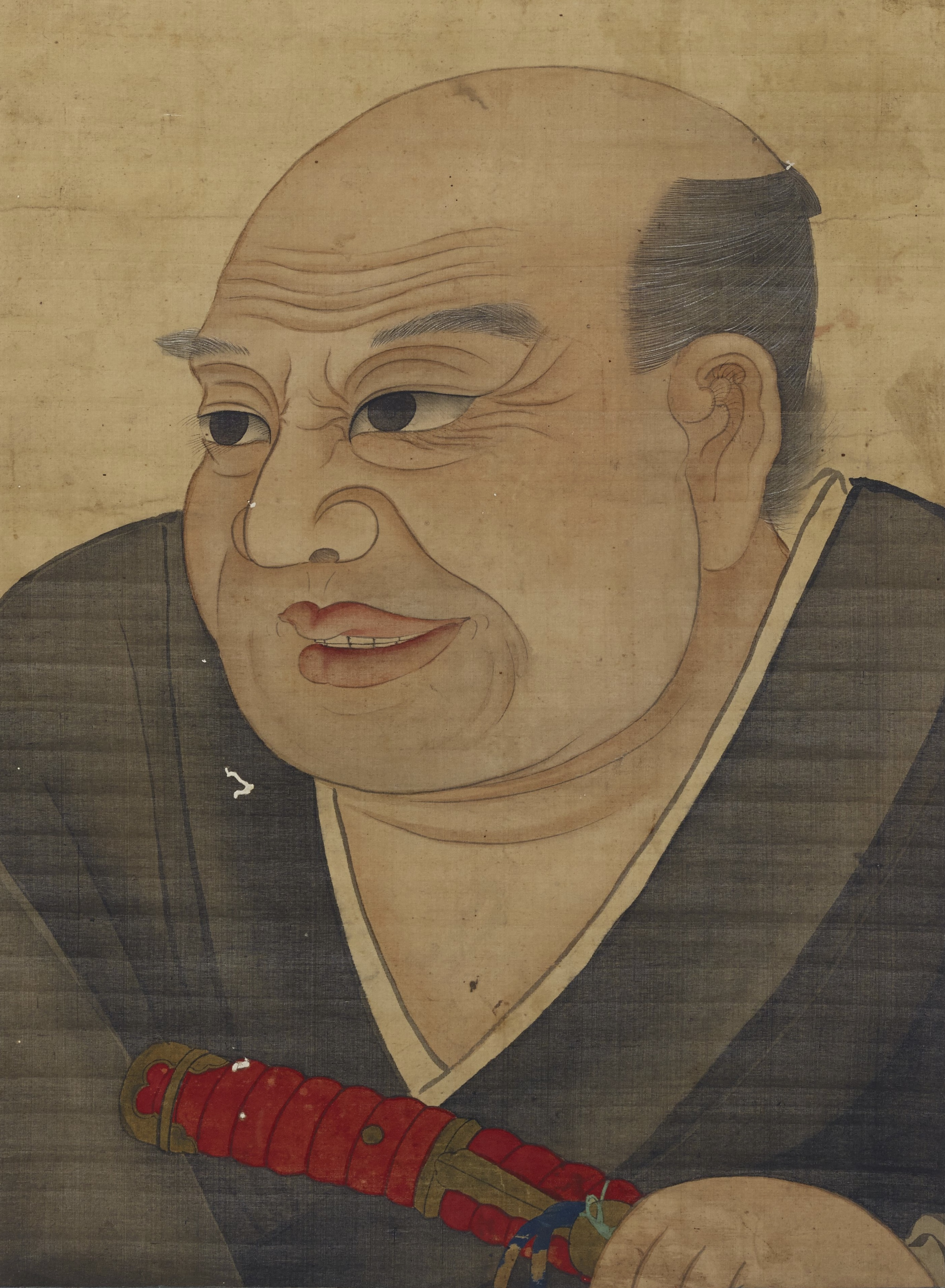

Sakakibara Kōzan (榊原香山; 1734 – 8 January 1798) was a samurai, a Confucian scholar and author in the middle of the Japanese Edo period. Kozan studied the construction techniques of Japanese armour from previous eras and provided a thorough report on constructing steel plate armour and its lamination with iron plate in his work, "The Fabrication of Armor and Helmets in Sixteenth-Century Japan."

== Bibliography ==
The Manufacture of Armour and Helmets in Sixteenth Century Japan (Chūkokatchū Seisakuben) (1800) by Sakakibara Kōzan
