= Timeline of women's legal rights (other than voting) in the 19th century =

Timeline of women's legal rights (other than voting) represents formal changes and reforms regarding women's rights. That includes actual law reforms as well as other formal changes, such as reforms through new interpretations of laws by precedents.

Formal changes and reforms regarding women's right to vote are exempted from this timeline: for that right, see Timeline of women's suffrage. This timeline also excludes ideological changes and events within feminism and antifeminism: for that, see Timeline of feminism.

== Timeline ==
=== 1800–1849 ===
1803

- United Kingdom: Lord Ellenborough's Act was enacted, making abortion after quickening a capital crime, and providing lesser penalties for the felony of abortion before quickening.

1804

- Sweden: Women are granted the permit to manufacture and sell candles.
- France: Divorce is abolished for women in 1804.
- France: Equal inheritance rights for women were abolished in 1804.

1810

- France: Until 1994, France kept in the French Penal Code the article from 1810 that exonerated a rapist in the event of a marriage to their victim.
- France: The 1810 Napoleonic Code of France punished any person who procured an abortion with imprisonment.
- Sweden: The right of an unmarried woman to be declared of legal majority by royal dispensation is officially confirmed by parliament.
- Sweden: Amendment to the Guild Regulation of 1720 secures the right of all women of legal majority to apply and be granted a permit to work within all guild professions, trades and handicrafts without having to fulfill the normal requirement of male applicants, because of their greater difficulty to support themselves.

1811

- Austria: Married women are granted separate economy and the right to choose a profession.
- Sweden: Married businesswomen are granted the right to make decisions about their own affairs without their husband's consent.

1817

- England: Public whipping of women abolished (public whipping of men followed in 1868).

1820–1900

- United States: Primarily through the efforts of physicians in the American Medical Association and legislators, most abortions in the U.S. were outlawed.

1821

- United States, Maine: Married women allowed to own and manage property in their own name during the incapacity of their spouse.
- United States, Connecticut: A law targeted apothecaries who sold "poisons" to women for purposes of inducing an abortion.

1823

- Argentina: The charitable Beneficial Society is charged by the government to establish and control (private) elementary schools for girls (they retain the control of the schools for girls until 1876).
- United Kingdom: Offences Against the Person Act 1828

1827

- United States, Illinois: An 1827 Illinois law prohibited the sale of drugs that could induce abortions. The law classed these medications as a "poison". The 1827 law was the first in the nation to impose criminal penalties in connection with abortion before quickening.
- United States, New York: The first statute to criminalize abortion in New York State was enacted in 1827. This law made post-quickening abortions a felony and made pre-quickening abortions a misdemeanor.

1829

- India: The Bengal Sati Regulation, 1829 bans the practice of Sati in British Bengal (the ban is extended to Madras and Bombay the following year).
- Sweden: Midwives are allowed to use surgical instruments, which are unique in Europe at the time and gives them surgical status.
- United States, New York: New York made post-quickening abortions a felony and pre-quickening abortions a misdemeanor.

1830

- Madras and Bombay: The practice of Sati is banned in Madras and Bombay.
- Monaco and Spain: Male-preference primogeniture is currently practised in succession to the thrones of Monaco and Spain (before 1700 and since 1830).

1833

- Spain: A variation on agnatic primogeniture is the so-called semi-Salic law, or "agnatic-cognatic primogeniture", which allows women to succeed only at the extinction of all the male descendants in the male line. Such was the case in Bourbon Spain until 1833.

1835

- United States, Arkansas: Married women allowed to own (but not control) property in their own name.
- United States, Massachusetts: Married women allowed to own and manage property in their own name during the incapacity of their spouse.
- United States, Tennessee: Married women allowed to own and manage property in their own name during the incapacity of their spouse.
- Ireland: Contraception in Ireland was made illegal in 1835 under the 1835 Criminal Law (Amendment) Act.
- Greece: The modern Greek state and its penal system were created in the 1830s based on Bavarian laws. The system was designed by Georg Ludwig von Maurer and came into effect in 1835. Articles 303-305 addressed abortion, either performed by a pregnant woman or a third party. Article 303-304: "If the mother who gave birth to a premature or dead infant used prior to that, knowingly, alone or with someone else, internal or external means, [means that] can cause a premature delivery or the death of the fetus in the mother's abdomen, she is punished with imprisonment. The same penalty is imposed on the midwives or pharmacists or others in the medical service who cause abortion with the consent of the pregnant woman or by recommending or by providing the means for performing such a felony." These sentences carried a maximum punishment of ten years for both the pregnant woman committing the act herself, as well as for any third party assistants. This law, although amended in the 20th century, remained effectively unchanged and enforced for 90 years.

1839

- United Kingdom: The Custody of Infants Act 1839 makes it possible for divorced mothers to be granted custody of their children.
- United States, Mississippi: The Married Women's Property Act 1839 grants married women the right to own (but not control) property in her own name.

1840

- Republic of Texas: Married women allowed to own property in their own name.
- United States, Maine: Married women allowed to own (but not control) property in their own name.
- United States, Maryland: Married women allowed to own (but not control) property in their own name.

1842

- Norway: Unmarried women are given the right to engage in small scale commerce (though only within the country).
- Sweden: Compulsory Elementary school for both sexes.
- United States, New Hampshire: Married women allowed to own and manage property in their own name during the incapacity of their spouse.
- Japan: The Shogunate in Japan banned induced abortion in Edo, but the law did not affect the rest of the country until 1869, when abortion was banned nationwide.
- United Kingdom: The Mines and Collieries Act 1842, commonly known as the Mines Act 1842, was an act of the Parliament of the United Kingdom which forbade women and girls of any age to work underground and introduced a minimum age of ten for boys employed in underground work.

1843

- United States, Kentucky: Married women allowed to own and manage property in their own name during the incapacity of their spouse.

1844

- United States, Maine: Married women granted separate economy.
- United States, Maine: Married women granted trade license.
- United States, Massachusetts: Married Women granted separate economy.

1845

- Denmark: Married women, despite being minors, are given the right to make a will without the approval of their husbands.
- Norway: "Law on the vast majority for single women", for which the age of majority was recognized at age 25, without a requirement for submitting to a guardian after that age.
- Sweden: Equal inheritance for sons and daughters (in the absence of a will).
- United States, New York: Married women granted patent rights.
- United States, New York: New York passed a statute that said women who had abortions could be given a prison sentence of three months to a year. They were one of the few states at the time to have laws punishing women for getting abortions.
- United States, Florida: Married women allowed to own (but not control) property in their own name.

1846

- Sweden: All Trade- and crafts works professions previously controlled by the guilds are opened to all women of legal majority through the Fabriks och Handtwerksordning and the Handelsordningen.
- United States, Alabama: Married women allowed to own (but not control) property in their own name.
- United States, Kentucky: Married women allowed to own (but not control) property in their own name.
- United States, Ohio: Married women allowed to own (but not control) property in their own name.
- United States, Michigan: Married women allowed to own and manage property in their own name during the incapacity of their spouse.

1847

- Belgium: Elementary school for both genders
- Costa Rica: The first high school for girls, and the profession of teacher is open to women.

1848

- United States, State of New York: Married Women's Property Act grant married women separate economy.
- United States, Pennsylvania: Married women granted separate economy.
- United States, Rhode Island: Married women granted separate economy.

1849

- India: Secondary education is made available by the foundation of the Bethune School.
- United States, Alabama: Married women allowed to own and manage property in their own name during the incapacity of their spouse.
- United States, Connecticut: Married women allowed to own and manage property in their own name during the incapacity of their spouse.
- United States, Missouri: Married women allowed to own (but not control) property in their own name.
- United States, South Carolina: Married women allowed to own (but not control) property in their own name.

=== 1850–1874 ===
1850s

- United States, Illinois: When Illinois opened its first hospital for the mentally ill in 1851, the state legislature passed a law that within two years of its passage was amended to require a public hearing before a person could be committed against his or her will. There was one exception, however: a husband could have his wife committed without either a public hearing or her consent.

1850

- France: Elementary education for both sexes, but girls are only allowed to be tutored by teachers from the church.
- Haiti: The first permanent school for girls.
- Iceland: Equal inheritance.
- United States, California: Married Women's Property Act grant married women separate economy.
- United States, Wisconsin: Married Women's Property Act grant married women separate economy.
- United States, Oregon: Unmarried women are allowed to own land.
- United States, Tennessee: Tennessee became the first state in the United States to explicitly outlaw wife beating.

1851

- Guatemala: Full citizenship is granted to economically independent women (rescinded in 1879).
- Canada, New Brunswick : Married women granted separate economy.

1852

- Portugal: During the Constitutional Monarchy, the article 358 of the Penal Code of Portugal (1852) defined and prohibited abortion, which was punished with time in prison and considered, as a mitigating factor, abortions that were done to hide the dishonor of the mother. The Penal Code of 1886 transposed, with little change, the abortion law of 1852.
- Austria: For more than a century, the Austrian abortion policy was largely governed by the 1852 legislation that criminalized abortion. Both the woman willingly attempting to end her pregnancy and the individual conducting the abortion faced up to five years in jail. However, there were a few legal exceptions. If the pregnant woman's life were in urgent danger or her bodily and mental health would be significantly harmed by prolonging the pregnancy, there was no penalty if the pregnancy was the result of rape and use of force. Only the medical practitioner was permitted to conduct the abortion in these rare situations.
- Nicaragua: Josefa Vega granted dispensation to attend lectures at university, after which women are given the right to apply for permission to attend lectures at university (though not to an actual full university education).
- United States, New Jersey: Married Women granted separate economy.
- United States, Indiana: Married women allowed to own (but not control) property in their own name.
- United States, Wisconsin: Married women allowed to own and manage property in their own name during the incapacity of their spouse.

1853

- Denmark: From 1853 until 1953, the crown passed according to agnatic primogeniture.
- Egypt: The first Egyptian school for females is opened by the Copts minority.
- Serbia: The first secondary educational school for females is inaugurated (public schools for girls having opened in 1845–46).
- Sweden: The profession of teacher at public primary and elementary schools are opened to both sexes.

1854

- Norway: Equal inheritance.
- United States, Massachusetts: Married women granted separate economy.
- Chile: The first public elementary school for girls.

1855

- Ottoman Empire: Factory work are open to both sexes when the first women are employed at the textile factory at Bursa, at the same time allowing them to mix unveiled with men.
- United States, Iowa: University of Iowa becomes the first coeducational public or state university in the United States.
- United States, Michigan: Married women granted separate economy.

1856

- Denmark: Equal inheritance rights.
- Sweden: Women accepted as students at the Royal Academy of Music.
- United States, Connecticut: Married women granted patent rights.

1857

- Denmark: Legal majority for unmarried women.
- Denmark: Trades and crafts professions are opened to unmarried women.
- United Kingdom: Matrimonial Causes Act 1857 makes divorce possible for both sexes.
- Netherlands: Elementary education compulsory for both girls and boys.
- Spain: Elementary education compulsory for both girls and boys.
- United States, Maine: Married women granted the right to control their own earnings.
- United States, Oregon: Married women allowed to own (but not control) property in their own name.
- United States, Oregon: Married women allowed to own and manage property in their own name during the incapacity of their spouse.

1858

- Ottoman Empire: The first state school for girls is opened; several other schools for girls are opened during the following decades.
- Norway: Telegraph office professions open to women.
- Russia: Gymnasiums for girls.
- Sweden: Legal majority for unmarried women (if applied for: automatic legal majority in 1863).

1859

- Canada West: Married women granted separate economy.
- Denmark: The post of teacher at public schools are opened to women.
- Russia: Women allowed to audit university lectures (retracted in 1863).
- Sweden: The post of college teacher and lower official at public institutions are open to women.
- United States, Kansas: Married Women's Property Act granted married women separate economy.

1860

- Norway: Women are allowed to teach in the rural elementary school system (in the city schools in 1869).
- New Zealand: Married women allowed to own property (extended in 1870).
- United States, New York: New York's Married Women's Property Act of 1860 passed. Married women granted the right to control their own earnings.
- United States, Maryland: Married women granted separate economy.
- United States, Maryland: Married women granted the right to control their earnings.
- United States, Maryland: Married women granted trade license.
- United States, Massachusetts: Married women granted trade licenses.

1861

- France: Julie-Victoire Daubié becomes the first female student.
- Iceland: Legal majority for unmarried women.
- India: Sati is banned in the entire India.
- Russia: The Scientific- and Medical Surgery Academy open laboratories for women (retracted in 1864).
- Sweden: The first public institution of higher academic learning for women, Högre lärarinneseminariet, is opened.
- Sweden: The dentist profession is opened to women.
- United States, Illinois: Married women granted separate economy.
- United States, Ohio: Married women granted separate economy.
- United States, Illinois: Married women granted control over their earnings.
- United States, Ohio: Married women granted control over their earnings.
- United Kingdom: Offences Against the Person Act 1861

1862

- United States, New York: New York's Married Women's Property Act of 1860 was amended so that women lost equal guardianship of their children, and only had veto power over decisions on apprenticeship and the appointment of testamentary guardians. Also, the parts of the 1860 law that made husbands and wives equal in realty in cases of intestacy were overturned.

1863

- Denmark: Colleges open to women.
- Norway: A new law is passed on the age of majority that succeeds that of 1845: women attained the age of majority at 25 years, as well as men. As for widows, divorced and separated, they become major "regardless of age".
- Serbia: The inauguration of the Women's High School in Belgrade, first high school open to women in Serbia (and the entire Balkans).
- Sweden: The Post- and telegraph professions are opened to women.

1864

- Belgium: The first official secondary education school open to females in Belgium.
- Bohemia: Taxpaying women and women in "learned profession" eligible to the legislative body.
- Finland: Legal majority for unmarried women.
- Haiti: Elementary schools for girls are founded.
- Serbia: The University of Belgrade is founded: females are theoretically allowed from the start, though the first two female students did not graduate until 1891.
- Sweden: Women of legal majority (unmarried, divorced and widowed women) are granted the same rights within trade and commerce as men by the Decree of Extended Freedom of Trade (Sweden).
- Sweden: Husbands are forbidden to abuse their wives.
- Sweden: The gymnastics profession is open to women, and female students accepted at the Royal Central Gymnastics Institute.
- Sweden: Women, previously only accepted with dispensation, are accepted as students at the Royal Swedish Academy of Arts.
- Sweden: The reformed law of 1864 abolished the death penalty for abortion and replaced it with between two and six years of penal labour for both the patient who received an abortion, as well as for the person who provided it.
- United States, North Carolina: The Supreme Court of North Carolina decided, in the case State v. Black, that, "A husband cannot be convicted of a battery on his wife unless he inflicts a permanent injury or uses such excessive violence or cruelty as indicates malignity or vindictiveness; and it makes no difference that the husband and wife are living separate by agreement."

1865

- Ireland: Married Women's Property (Ireland) Act 1865
- Italy: Legal majority for unmarried women.
- Italy: Equal inheritance.
- Italy: A married woman is allowed to become the legal guardian of her children and their property if abandoned by her husband.
- Romania: The educational reform granted all Romanians access to education, which, at least formally, gave also women and girls the right to attend school from elementary education to university.
- Romania: The Romanian Penal Code of 1865, which followed shortly after the union of the Principalities of Moldavia and Wallachia, and was in force between 1865 and 1936, banned abortion. Article 246 punished the person who performed the abortion with "minimul recluziunei" (a shorter form of imprisonment), while the pregnant woman who procured her own abortion was only punished with 6 months-2 years imprisonment. The punishment increased for the persons who performed abortion if they were medical workers, or if the pregnant woman died.
- US, Louisiana: Married women allowed to own and manage property in their own name during the incapacity of their spouse.

1866

- Norway: Unmarried women are given the same rights as men within commerce.
- Denmark: With the new penal code of 1866, the maximum penalty for abortion was reduced to eight years of penal labor.

1867

- Portugal: The Civil Code of 1867 secure legal majority and freedom from guardianship for unmarried, legally separated or widowed women, allows for civil marriage and gives married women the option to secure their right to separate economy by agreement prior to marriage.
- Switzerland: Zürich University formally open to women, though they had already been allowed to attend lectures a few years prior.
- United States, Alabama: Married women granted separate economy.
- United States, New Hampshire: Married women granted separate economy.
- United States, Illinois: In 1867, the State of Illinois passed a "Bill for the Protection of Personal Liberty" which guaranteed all people accused of insanity, including wives, had the right to a public hearing.
- United States, Illinois: Illinois passed a bill in 1867 that made abortion and attempted abortion a criminal offense.
- New Zealand: In 1867, the New Zealand Parliament made it an offence to cause a miscarriage. Under the law, abortion providers were considered criminals while the woman seeking an abortion was considered an accomplice to the crime. If a woman induced her own abortion, she was considered a criminal under the law. Therapeutic abortions were available under limited circumstances such as when the mother's life or mental health was in serious danger. During the late 1930s, this right was extended by a court judgment. However, abortion was still strongly frowned upon by society with many doctors refusing to perform terminations.
- Belgium: Abortion in Belgium was first prohibited without exception by Articles 348 to 353 of the Belgian Criminal Code of 1867. Abortion was then defined as one of the crimes "against the order of families and against public morality". However, very few legal proceedings against illegal abortions took place until 1923, when a bill originally submitted by Henry Carton de Wiart in 1913 was passed by the Belgian parliament that formally coded in legal penalties for incitement to abortion as well as advertising and promotion of contraception.

1868

- Croatia: The first high school open to females.
- United States, North Carolina: Married women granted separate economy.
- United States, Arkansas: Married women granted trade license.
- United States, Kansas: Married women granted separate economy.
- United States, Kansas: Married women granted trade license.
- United States, Kansas: Married women granted control over their earnings.
- United States, South Carolina: Married women allowed to own (but not control) property in their own name.
- United States, Georgia: Married women allowed to own (but not control) property in their own name.
- Japan: The emperor banned midwives from performing abortions.
- United States: New York City: Susannah Lattin's death led to an investigation that resulted in regulating maternity clinics and adoptions in New York City in 1868.

1869

- Austria-Hungary: The profession of public school teacher is open to women.
- Costa Rica: Elementary education compulsory for both girls and boys.
- United Kingdom: Girton College, Cambridge.
- Ottoman Empire: The law formally introduce compulsory elementary education for both boys and girls.
- Russia: University Courses for women are opened, which opens the profession of teacher, law assistant and similar lower academic professions for women (in 1876, the courses are no longer allowed to give exams, and in 1883, all outside of the capital is closed).
- Sweden: Women allowed to work in the railway office.
- United States, Minnesota: Married women granted separate economy.
- Japan: Abortion was banned nationwide.
- Canada: Abortion was banned in Canada.
- United States, Illinois and Massachusetts: In 1869 legislation was passed in Illinois and Massachusetts allowing married women equal rights to property and custody of their children.

Circa 1870

- United States, Illinois: Around 1870, Illinois passed another law banning the sale of drugs that could cause induced abortions. The law is notable because it allowed an exception for "the written prescription of some well-known and respectable practicing physician".

1870

- Argentina: The 1870 Civil Code secure legal majority for unmarried women and widows, though it confirms married women as minors.
- Finland: Women allowed to study at the universities by dispensation (dispensation demand dropped in 1901).
- United Kingdom: Married Women's Property Act 1870
- India: Female Infanticide Prevention Act, 1870
- Mexico: Married women granted separate economy.
- Ottoman Empire: The Teachers College for Girls are opened in Constantinople to educate women to professional teachers for girls school; the profession of teacher becomes accessible for women and education accessible to girls.
- Spain: The Asociación para la Enseñanza de la Mujer is founded: promoting education for women, it establishes secondary schools and training colleges all over Spain, which makes secondary and higher education open to females for the first time.
- Sweden: Universities open to women (at the same terms as men 1873). The first female student is Betty Pettersson.
- United States, Georgia: Married women granted separate economy.
- United States, South Carolina: Married women granted separate economy.
- United States, South Carolina: Married women granted trade license.
- United States, Tennessee: Married women granted separate economy.
- United States, Iowa: Married women granted control over their earnings.
- United States, Wyoming Territory: Justice Howe of the Wyoming Territory saw fit to extend women the rights to sit on a jury in 1870. This was put into action and women served on gender-mixed juries with men for the next year. The first woman to serve on a jury was Eliza Stewart Boyd. But once Howe was replaced by his successor in 1871, women were no longer called upon to serve on juries. (1870, 1890-1892).

1871

- India: First training school for woman teachers.
- Japan: Women are allowed to study in the USA (though not yet in Japan itself).
- New Zealand: Universities open to women.
- United States, Mississippi: Married women granted separate economy.
- United States, Mississippi: Married women granted trade license.
- United States, Mississippi: Married women granted control over their earnings.
- United States, Arizona: Married women granted separate economy.
- United States, Arizona: Married women granted trade license.

1872

- Austria-Hungary: Women allowed to work in the post- and telegraph office.
- Canada: Dominion Lands Act grants mothers without husbands homestead land.
- Japan: Geisha and prostitutes are freed from guardianship and granted legal majority and the right to change profession.
- Japan: Compulsory elementary education for both girls and boys.
- Japan: The Japanese government issued an edict (May 4, 1872, Grand Council of State Edict 98) stating, "Any remaining practices of female exclusion on shrine and temple lands shall be immediately abolished, and mountain climbing for the purpose of worship, etc., shall be permitted". However, women in Japan today do not have complete access to all such places.
- Ottoman Empire: The first government primary school open to both genders. Women's Teacher's Training School opened in Istanbul.
- Spain: María Elena Maseras is allowed to enlist as a university student with special dispensation: having been formally admitted to a class in 1875, she was finally allowed to graduate 1882, which created a Precedent allowing females to enroll at universities from this point on.
- Sweden: Women are granted unlimited right to choose marriage partner without the need of any permission from her family, and arranged marriages are thereby banned (women of the nobility, however, are not granted the same right until 1882).
- Switzerland: The universities of Bern and Geneva open to women (Lausanne follow in 1876 and Basel in 1890).
- United States, Pennsylvania: Married women granted control over their earnings.
- United States, California: Married women granted separate economy.
- United States, Montana: Married women granted separate economy.
- United States, California: Married women granted trade license.
- United States, California: Married women granted control over their earnings.
- United States, Wisconsin: Married women granted control over their earnings.
- United States, New York: New York state made it a penalty to perform an abortion, with a criminal sentence of between 4 and 20 years in prison.

1873

- Egypt: The first public Egyptian primary school open to females (Suyufiyya Girls' School): two years later, there are 32 primary schools for females in Egypt, three of whom also offered secondary education.
- United Kingdom: Custody of Infants Act 1873; Mothers granted guardianship for children at divorce.
- United States, Arkansas: Married women granted separate economy.
- United States, Kentucky: Married women granted separate economy.
- United States, North Carolina: Married women granted control over their earnings.
- United States, Kentucky: Married women granted trade license.
- United States, Arkansas: Married women granted control over their earnings.
- United States, Delaware: Married women granted control over their earnings.
- United States, Iowa: Married women granted separate economy.
- United States, Nevada: Married women granted separate economy.
- United States, Iowa: Married women granted trade license.
- United States, Nevada: Married women granted trade license.
- United States, Nevada: Married women granted control over their earnings.
- United States: The Comstock Law was a federal act passed by the United States Congress on March 3, 1873, as the Act for the "Suppression of Trade in, and Circulation of, Obscene Literature and Articles of Immoral Use". The Act criminalized usage of the U.S. Postal Service to send any of the following items:
  - erotica
  - contraceptives
  - abortifacients
  - sex toys
  - Personal letters alluding to any sexual content or information
  - information regarding the above items.

In places like Washington D.C., where the federal government had direct jurisdiction, the act also made it a misdemeanor, punishable by fine and imprisonment, to sell, give away, or have in possession any "obscene" publication. Half of the states passed similar anti-obscenity statutes that also banned possession and sale of obscene materials, including contraceptives.
The law was named after its chief proponent, Anthony Comstock. Due to his own personal enforcement of the law during its early days, Comstock received a commission from the postmaster general to serve as a special agent for the U.S. Postal Services.

- United States: Bradwell v. Illinois, 83 U.S. (16 Wall.) 130 (1873), was a United States Supreme Court case which ruled that women were not granted the right to practice a profession under the United States Constitution. The case was brought to the court by Myra Bradwell, who sought to be admitted to the bar to practice law in Illinois. The Court ruled that the Privileges and Immunities Clause of the Fourteenth Amendment did not include the right to practice a profession as a woman.

1874

- France: First trade union open to women.
- Iran: The first school for girls is founded by American missionaries (only non-Muslims attend until 1891).
- Japan: The profession of public school teacher is opened to women.
- Netherlands: Aletta Jacobs becomes the first woman allowed to study medicine.
- Sweden: Married women granted control over their own income.
- United States, Massachusetts: Married women granted control over their earnings.
- United States, New Jersey: Married women granted control over their earnings.
- United States, Rhode Island: Married women granted control over their earnings.
- United States, New Jersey: Married women granted trade licenses.
- United States, Colorado: Married women granted separate economy.
- United States, Illinois: Married women granted trade license.
- United States, Minnesota: Married women granted trade license.
- United States, Montana: Married women granted control over their earnings.
- United States, Montana: Married women granted trade license.
- United States, Colorado: Married women granted trade license.
- United States, Colorado: Married women granted control over their earnings.

=== 1875–1899 ===
1875

- Denmark: Universities open to women.
- India: First women admitted to college courses, although with special permission (at Madras Medical College).
- United States, Delaware: Married women granted separate economy.
- United States: The Page Act of 1875 (Sect. 141, 18 Stat. 477, 3 March 1875) was the first restrictive federal immigration law in the United States, and effectively prohibited the entry of Chinese women, marking the end of open borders. The law technically barred immigrants considered "undesirable", defining this as a person from East Asia who was coming to the United States to be a forced laborer, any East Asian woman who would engage in prostitution, and all people considered to be convicts in their own country. Only the ban on female East Asian immigrants was effectively and heavily enforced, and it proved to be a barrier for all East Asian women trying to immigrate, especially Chinese women. The Act was later repealed.

1876

- Argentina: Girls are included in the national school system by the transference of the control of the private girls schools from the charitable Beneficent Society to the provincial government.
- United Kingdom: The Medical Act 1876 (39 & 40 Vict. c. 41) was an act which repealed the previous Medical Act in the United Kingdom and allowed all British medical authorities to license all qualified applicants whatever their gender.
- United Kingdom: Universities open to women.
- India: Women allowed to attend university exams at the Calcutta University.
- Italy: Universities open to women.
- Netherlands: Universities open to women.
- United States, New Hampshire: Married women granted trade licenses.
- United States, Wyoming: Married women granted separate economy.
- United States, Wyoming: Married women granted control over their earnings.
- United States, Wyoming: Married women granted trade license.

1877

- Chile: Universities open to women.
- Italy: Women can serve as witnesses to legal acts.
- Scotland: Married Women's Property (Scotland) Act 1877.
- United States, Connecticut: Married women granted control over their earnings.
- United States, Connecticut: Married women granted trade licenses.
- United States, Dakota: Married women granted separate economy.
- United States, Dakota: Married women granted control over their earnings.
- United States, Dakota: Married women granted trade license.
- United States, Wisconsin: On March 22, 1877, the Wisconsin legislature enacted a law which prohibited courts from denying admission to the bar on the basis of sex. The bill had been drafted by Lavinia Goodell and she worked with Speaker of the Wisconsin State Assembly John B. Cassoday for it to pass.

1878

- Austria-Hungary: Women allowed to attend university lectures as guest auditors.
- Bulgaria: Elementary education for both sexes.
- Finland: Equal inheritance.
- United Kingdom: Women can secure a separation on the grounds of cruelty, claim custody of their children and demand spousal and child support. Abused wives granted separation orders.
- United Kingdom: Lady Margaret Hall, Oxford
- United States, Virginia: Married women granted separate economy.

1879

- Brazil: Universities open to women.
- France: Colleges and secondary education open to women.
- India: The first college open to women: Bethune College (the first female graduate in 1883).
- United States, California: "A person may not be disqualified from entering or pursuing a business, profession, vocation, or employment because of sex, race, creed, color, or national or ethnic origin." - California Constitution, Article I, §8 (1879).
- United States, Indiana: Married women granted separate economy.
- United States, Indiana: Married women granted control over their earnings.
- United States: A law was enacted allowing qualified female attorneys to practice in any federal court in the United States.

1880

- Australia : Universities open to women.
- Belgium: The university of Brussels open to women.
- Canada: Universities open to women.
- Denmark: Married women granted the right to control their own income.
- France: Universities open to women.
- France: Free public secondary education to women.
- France: Public teachers training schools open to women.
- United States, Oregon: Married women granted trade license.
- United States, Oregon: Married women granted control over their earnings.
- Japan: Japan's first penal code declared abortion a crime.
- United States: The case Miles v. United States, 103 U.S. 304 (1880) established that a second wife may testify as to her husband's bigamy, because their marriage is not de jure.

1881

- France: Women allowed to open a savings account passbook without their spouse's permission.
- Scotland: Married Women's Property (Scotland) Act 1881
- United States, Vermont: Married women granted separate economy.
- United States, Vermont: Married women granted trade license.
- United States, Nebraska: Married women granted separate economy.
- United States, Nebraska: Married women granted trade license.
- United States, Nebraska: Married women granted control over their earnings.
- United States, Florida: Married women allowed to own and manage property in their own name during the incapacity of their spouse.

1882

- United Kingdom: Married Women's Property Act 1882
- France: Compulsory elementary education for both genders.
- Norway: Women allowed to study at the university.
- Nicaragua: The first public secular education institution for women, Colegio de Senoritas, open.
- Poland: The Flying University provides academic education for women.
- Serbia: Compulsory education for both sexes.
- United States: Lindon v. First National Bank, 10 F. 894 (W.D. Pa. 1882), is one of the very earliest precedent-setting US federal court cases involving common law name change. A woman who had changed her last name to one that was not her husband's original surname was trying to claim control over her inheritance. The court ruled in her favor. This set forth many things. By common law, one may lawfully change their name and be "known and recognized" by that new name. Also, one may enter into any kinds of contracts in their new adopted name. Contracts include employment (see Coppage v. Kansas 236 U.S. 1), and one can be recognized legally in court in their new name.

1883

- Belgium: Universities open to women.
- India: Bombay University open to women.
- Romania: Universities open to women.
- Victoria, Australia: Married women granted separate economy.
- Washington Territory, United States: Women in the Washington Territory were granted jury service rights, but those rights were rescinded in 1887 due to a change in the territory's Supreme Court.

1884

- France: Equal divorce legalized for women and men.
- Switzerland: Legal majority for unmarried women (including widows).
- Norway: Universities open to women.
- Germany: Legal majority for unmarried women.
- Mexico: Legal majority for unmarried women and separate economy granted for married women.
- Ontario: Married women granted separate economy.
- United Kingdom: Married Women's Property Act 1884

1886

- Costa Rica: A public academic educational institution open to women.
- France: Married women allowed to open a bank account without the consent of her husband.
- France: Women eligible to public education boards.
- United Kingdom: Guardianship of Infants Act 1886
- United Kingdom: Josephine Butler puts a stop to the prostitution reglement.
- Guatemala: Married women granted separate economy.
- Korea: The first educational institution for women, Ewha Womans University
- Portugal: Article 400 of the Portuguese penal code of 1886, which still functioned in post-colonial Mozambique until its replacement on 11 July 2014, stated that rapists who married their victim would not be punished. The law was not applied since independence in 1974. It was repealed in 2014.

1887

- Albania: The first Albanian language elementary school open to female pupils.
- Costa Rica: Legal majority for married women.
- Costa Rica: Married women granted separate economy.
- Mexico: Universities open to women.
- United States, Idaho: Married women granted separate economy.
- United States, Idaho: Married women granted trade license.
- United States: The Edmunds–Tucker Act disincorporated both the LDS Church and the Perpetual Emigration Fund on the grounds that they fostered polygamy. The act prohibited the practice of polygamy and punished it with a fine of from $500 to $800 and imprisonment of up to five years. It dissolved the corporation of the church and directed the confiscation by the federal government of all church properties valued over a limit of $50,000. The act was enforced by the U.S. Marshal and a host of deputies. The act:
  - Disincorporated the LDS Church and the Perpetual Emigrating Fund Company, with assets to be used for public schools in the Territory.
  - Required an anti-polygamy oath for prospective voters, jurors and public officials.
  - Annulled territorial laws allowing illegitimate children to inherit.
  - Required civil marriage licenses (to aid in the prosecution of polygamy).
  - Abrogated the common law spousal privilege for polygamists, thus requiring wives to testify against their husbands.
  - Disenfranchised women (who had been enfranchised by the Territorial legislature in 1870).
  - Replaced local judges (including the previously powerful Probate Court judges) with federally appointed judges.
  - Abolished the office of Territorial superintendent of district schools, granting the supreme court of the Territory of Utah the right to appoint a commissioner of schools. Also called for the prohibition of the use of sectarian books and for the collection of statistics of the number of so-called gentiles and Mormons attending and teaching in the schools.
    In 1890 the U.S. Supreme Court upheld the seizure of Church property under the Edmunds–Tucker Act in Late Corporation of the Church of Jesus Christ of Latter-Day Saints v. United States. The act was repealed in 1978.
- United States, Washington Territory: Women in the Washington Territory were granted jury service rights, but those rights were rescinded in 1887 due to a change in the territory's Supreme Court.

1888

- Costa Rica: Married women are allowed to be guardians and execute wills.
- Denmark: Fathers are forced to pay support to illegitimate children.
- Serbia: Universities open to women, the first two women graduating in 1891.
- Spain: Women are allowed to private university degrees by dispensation (Universities fully open to women in 1910).
- Norway: Legal majority for married women.
- Montenegro: Legal majority for unmarried women.

1889

- Egypt: The first teacher training college for women.
- Palestine: The first school open to girls founded by missionaries.
- Sweden: Women eligible to boards of public authority such as public school boards, public hospital boards, inspectors, poor care boards and similar positions.
- United States, State of Washington: Married women granted separate economy.
- United States, State of Washington: Married women granted control over their earnings.
- United States, State of Washington: Married women granted trade license.

1890

- United States: The case Bassett v. United States, 137 U.S. 496 (1890) had a ruling that polygamous wives can be required to testify as they are not legally wives.
- United States, Wyoming: "In their inherent right to life, liberty and the pursuit of happiness, all members of the human race are equal. Since equality in the enjoyment of natural and civil rights is only made sure through political equality, the laws of this state affecting the political rights and privileges of its citizens shall be without distinction of race, color, sex, or any circumstance or condition whatsoever other than the individual incompetency or unworthiness duly ascertained by a court of competent jurisdiction. The rights of citizens of the state of Wyoming to vote and hold office shall not be denied or abridged on account of sex. Both male and female citizens of this state shall equally enjoy all civil, political and religious rights and privileges.ta - Wyoming Constitution, Articles I and VI (1890).
- Bohemia: The first secondary education school for females in Prague.
- United Kingdom: Matrimonial Causes Act 1890
- Greece: Universities open to women.
- Norway: Married women gained majority status by law. Another law ended the authority of the husband over the wife. The man retained control of the home of the couple, but the woman could now freely dispose of the fruit of his work.
- Colombia: The 1890 Penal Code, in article 640, allowed for abortion when it was absolutely necessary to save the mother's life, but stated that the law did not recommend such means, which were "generally condemned" by the Catholic Church, the official religion at the time. In all other cases, a third party who attempted to abort a fetus without the woman's consent faced three to six years' imprisonment (five to ten years if the abortion was successful) or one to three years imprisonment if the woman consented (four to eight years if the abortion was successful). If a medical professional, midwife, or apothecary was found guilty of the above crimes, the sentence would be increased by six months to a year. The law also provided for reduced sentences, of 3–6 months (5–10 months if the abortion was successful), in the case of "honest women of good reputation" who received an abortion to "conceal their frailty" (aborto honoris causa).

1891

- Albania: The first school of higher education for women is opened.
- Germany: Women are allowed to attend university lectures, which makes it possible for individual professors to accept female students if they wish.
- Portugal: The first medical university degree is granted to a woman.
- Switzerland: Secondary schools opened to women.
- Switzerland: Trade unions opened to women.
- India: On 9 January 1891, the Viceroy of India, Lord Lansdowne presented a bill before the Council of India, which was then headed by Andrew Scoble, called the "Age of Consent". It sought to amend Section 376 of the Indian Penal Code. Previously, the age of consent had been set at 10 in 1860. After the bill was passed on 29 March 1891, the Section 376 included sex with a girl under 12 even if the person is the wife of the perpetrator, as rape.
- United Kingdom: The Slander of Women Act 1891 was enacted. The Act was repealed for the Republic of Ireland on 1 January 1962 and for England and Wales on 1 January 2014 by section 14(1) of the Defamation Act 2013.

1893

- France: Legal majority for unmarried, divorced and separated women.
- Ottoman Empire: Women are permitted to attend medical lectures at Istanbul University.
- United Kingdom: Married Women's Property Act 1893 grants married women control of property acquired during marriage.
- United States: In 1893, the South Carolina General Assembly "mandated that women should be allowed to attend [ South Carolina College ] as special students". (Two years later, the college's Board of Trustees made the decision to allow female students into the school.)

1894

- Norway: Married women given right to engage in commerce.
- Poland: Kraków University open to women.
- United States, Louisiana: Married women granted trade license.

1895

- Austria-Hungary : Universities open to women.
- Egypt: A public school system for girls is organized.
- France: Women eligible as administrators of public charity boards.
- Upper Canada: Women allowed to work as barristers.
- Russia: A Women's medical university are opened, which opens the profession of physician for women.
- United States, South Carolina: Separate economy allowed for married women.
- United States, Utah: Married women granted separate economy.
- United States, State of Washington: Married women granted control over their earnings.
- United States, State of Washington: Married women granted trade license.

1896

- Norway: Women are admitted at all secondary educational schools of the state.
- United States, Utah: "The rights of citizens of the State of Utah to vote and hold office shall not be denied or abridged on account of sex. Both male and female citizens of this State shall enjoy all civil, political and religious rights and privileges." - Utah Constitution, Article IV, §1 (1896).
- Japan: A law in Japan, dating from 1896, requires a married couple to have a common surname.

1897

- France: Women (regardless of marital status) eligible as witnesses in civil action.

1898

- France: Women eligible as administrators of commercial boards and mutual aid societies.
- Haiti: The Medical University accept female students in obstetrics.
- Serbia: Co-education, banned since the 1850s, is re-introduced, equalizing the schooling of males and females.
- Japan: The Revised Civil Code of 1898 stated that a woman who commits adultery is subject to divorce and up to two years in prison.
- United States, Utah: The Utah State Legislature granted women permission to serve on juries in 1898. Even though women were able to serve on juries starting in 1898, women were able to seek exemption from jury duty and they did not regularly serve on juries until the 1930s.

1899

- Denmark: Legal majority for married women.
- Iceland: Legal majority for married women.

== See also ==
- Legal rights of women in history
- Timeline of reproductive rights legislation
- Timeline of women's legal rights in the United States (other than voting)
- Timeline of women's legal rights (other than voting) before the 19th century
- Timeline of women's legal rights (other than voting) in the 20th century
- Timeline of women's legal rights (other than voting)
