= Timeline of women's legal rights (other than voting) before the 19th century =

Timeline of women's legal rights (other than voting) represents formal changes and reforms regarding women's rights. That includes actual law reforms as well as other formal changes, such as reforms through new interpretations of laws by precedents. The right to vote is exempted from the timeline: for that right, see Timeline of women's suffrage. The timeline excludes ideological changes and events within feminism and antifeminism: for that, see Timeline of feminism.

== Timeline ==
=== Pre history ===
24th century BC

- City-state Lagash in Mesopotamia: Some of the laws in the code of Urukagina were: Widows were exempted from taxes, and "When to the reeds of Enki a person has been brought...One woman’s headband, and one sila [about 1 liter] of princely fragrance shall the eresh-dingir priestess take away." As well, Urukagina greatly expanded the royal "Household of Women" from about 50 persons to about 1500 persons, renamed it the "Household of goddess Bau", gave it ownership of vast amounts of land confiscated from the former priesthood, and placed it under the supervision of his wife, Shasha (or Shagshag). However, Urukagina also seems to have abolished the former custom of polyandry in his country, on pain of the woman taking multiple husbands being stoned with rocks upon which her crime is written. No comparable laws from Urukagina addressing penalties for adultery by men have survived. There is also a statute from Urukagina's time stating that "if a woman says [text illegible...] to a man, her mouth is crushed with burnt bricks." The discovery of these fragments has led some modern critics to assert that they provide "the first written evidence of the degradation of women".

About 2100–2050 BC

- Mesopotamia (Code of Ur-Nammu): Some of the laws in the Code were: A woman (munus) went from being a daughter (dumu-mi) to a wife (dam), then if she outlived her husband, a widow (nu-ma-su), who could remarry. "If the wife of a man followed after another man and he slept with her, they shall slay that woman, but that male shall be set free", "If a man violates the right of another and deflowers the virgin wife of a young man, they shall kill that male", "If a man proceeded by force, and deflowered the virgin female slave of another man, that man must pay five shekels of silver", "If a man divorces his first-time wife, he shall pay (her) one mina of silver, "If it is a (former) widow whom he divorces, he shall pay (her) half a mina of silver", "If the man had slept with the widow without there having been any marriage contract, he need not pay any silver", "If a man accused the wife of a man of adultery, and the ordeal by water proved her innocent, then the man who had accused her must pay one-third of a mina of silver", "If a prospective son-in-law enters the house of his prospective father-in-law, but his father-in-law later gives his daughter to another man, the father-in-law shall return to the rejected son-in-law twofold the amount of bridal presents he had brought", "If a man’s slave-woman, comparing herself to her mistress, speaks insolently to her, her mouth shall be scoured with 1 quart of salt" and "If a slave woman strikes someone acting with the authority of her mistress, [text destroyed...]".

About 1870 BC

- Isin (Code of Lipit-Ishtar): Some of the laws were: "If the father is living, his daughter whether she be a high priestess, a priestess, or a hierodule shall dwell in his house like an heir", "If the second wife whom he had married bore him children, the dowry which she brought from her father's house belongs to her children but the children of his first wife and the children of his second wife shall divide equally the property of their father", "If a man married his wife and she bore him children and those children are living, and a slave also bore children for her master but the father granted freedom to the slave and her children, the children of the slave shall not divide the estate with the children of their former master", "If a man's wife has not borne him children but a harlot from the public square has borne him children, he shall provide grain, oil and clothing for that harlot. The children which the harlot has borne him shall be his heirs, and as long as his wife lives the harlot shall not live in the house with the wife", and "If a son-in-law has entered the house of his (prospective) father-in-law and afterwards they made him go out (of the house) and gave his wife to his companion, they shall present to him the betrothal gifts which he brought and that wife may not marry his companion."

About 1754 BC

- Babylon (Code of Hammurabi): Some of the laws in this Code were: Men were permitted to have affairs with their servants and slaves, whereas married women would be harshly punished for committing adultery. "If any one 'point the finger' at a sister of a god or the wife of any one, and can not prove it, this man shall be taken before the judges and his brow shall be marked (by cutting the skin, or perhaps hair)." "If a woman quarrel with her husband, and say: 'You are not congenial to me,' the reasons for her prejudice must be presented. If she is guiltless, and there is no fault on her part, but he leaves and neglects her, then no guilt attaches to this woman, she shall take her dowry and go back to her father's house."

About 1650 – 1500 BC

- Code of the Nesilim: Some of the laws were: "If anyone cause a free woman to miscarry, if it be the tenth month, he shall give ten half-shekels of silver, if it be the fifth month, he shall give five half-shekels of silver", "If anyone cause a female slave to miscarry, if it be the tenth month, he shall give five half-shekels of silver", "If a free man and a female slave be fond of each other and come together and he take her for his wife and they set up house and get children, and afterward they either become hostile or come to close quarters, and they divide the house between them, the man shall take the children, only one child shall the woman take", "If a slave take a woman as his wife, their case is the same. The majority of the children to the wife and one child to the slave", "If a slave take a female slave their case is the same. The majority of children to the female slave and one child to the slave", "If a slave convey the bride price to a free son and take him as husband for his daughter, nobody dare surrender him to slavery", "If a man have intercourse with his own mother, it is a capital crime, he shall die", "If a man have intercourse with a daughter, it is a capital crime, he shall die", "If a man and a woman come willingly, as men and women, and have intercourse, there shall be no punishment. And if a man have intercourse with his stepmother, there shall be no punishment; except if his father is living, it is a capital crime, the son shall die", "If a free man picks up now this woman, now that one, now in this country, then in that country, there shall be no punishment if they came together sexually willingly", "If the husband of a woman die, his wife may take her husband's patrimony", "If a free man pick up female slaves, now one, now another, there is no punishment for intercourse. If brothers sleep with a free woman, together, or one after the other, there is no punishment. If father and son sleep with a female slave or harlot, together, or one after the other, there is no punishment", "If a man sleep with the wife of his brother, while his brother is living, it is a capital crime, he shall die. If a man have taken a free woman, then have intercourse also with her daughter, it is a capital crime, he shall die. If he have taken her daughter, then have intercourse with her mother or her sister, it is a capital crime, he shall die", "If a man rape a woman in the mountain, it is the man's wrong, he shall die. But if he rape her in the house, it is the woman's fault, the woman shall die. If the husband find them and then kill them, there is no punishing the husband", and "If any man have intercourse with a foreign woman and pick up this one, now that one, there is no punishment."

About 1075 BC

- Assyria (Code of the Assura): Some of the laws of the Code were: "If a woman, whether the wife of a man or the daughter of a man, utter vulgarity or indulge in low talk, that woman bears her own sin; against her husband, her sons, or her daughter they shall have no claim", "If a woman bring her hand against a man, they shall prosecute her; 30 manas of lead shall she pay, 20 blows shall they inflict on her", "If a woman in a quarrel injure the testicle of a man, one of her fingers they shall cut off. And if a physician bind it up and the other testicle which is beside it be infected thereby, or take harm; or in a quarrel she injure the other testicle, they shall destroy both of her eyes", "If a man bring his hand against the wife of a man, treating her like a little child, and they prove it against him, and convict him, one of his fingers they shall cut off. If he kiss her, his lower lip with the blade of an axe they shall draw down and they shall cut off", "If the wife of a man be walking on the highway, and a man seize her, say to her 'I will surely have intercourse with you,' if she be not willing and defend herself, and he seize her by force and rape her, whether they catch him upon the wife of a man, or whether at the word of the woman whom he has raped, the elders shall prosecute him, they shall put him to death. There is no punishment for the woman", "If the wife of a man go out from her house and visit a man where he lives, and he have intercourse with her, knowing that she is a man's wife, the man and also the woman they shall put to death", "If a man have intercourse with the wife of a man either in an inn or on the highway, knowing that she is a man's wife, according as the man, whose wife she is, orders to be done, they shall do to the adulterer. If not knowing that she is a man's wife he rapes her, the adulterer goes free. The man shall prosecute his wife, doing to her as he likes", "If a man catch a man with his wife, both of them shall they put to death. If the husband of the woman put his wife to death, he shall also put the man to death. If he cut off the nose of his wife, he shall turn the man into a eunuch, and they shall disfigure the whole of his face", "If a man have relations with the wife of a man at her wish, there is no penalty for that man. The man shall lay upon the woman, his wife, the penalty he wishes", "If a man say to his companion, 'They have had intercourse with thy wife; I will prove it,' and he be not able to prove it, and do not prove it, on that man they shall inflict forty blows, a month of days he shall perform the king's work, they shall mutilate him, and one talent of lead he shall pay", "If a man strike the daughter of a man and cause her to drop what is in her, they shall prosecute him, they shall convict him, two talents and thirty manas of lead shall he pay, fifty blows they shall inflict on him, one month shall he toil", "If a woman be dwelling in the house of her father, and her husband have died, any gift which her husband settled upon her—if there be any sons of her husband's, they shall receive it. If there be no sons of her husband's she receives it", "If a woman be dwelling in the house of father, but has been given to her husband, whether she has been taken to the house of her husband or not, all debts, misdemeanors, and crimes of her husband shall she bear as if she too committed them. Likewise if she be dwelling with her husband, all crimes of his shall she bear as well", "If a woman, who is a widow, enter into the house of a man, whatsoever she brings with her—all is her husband's. But if a man enter in to a woman, whatsoever he brings—all is the woman's", "If a man divorce his wife, if he wish, he may give her something; if he does not wish, he need not give her anything. Empty shall she go out", "If the wives of a man, or the daughters of a man go out into the street, their heads are to be veiled. The prostitute is not to be veiled. Maidservants are not to veil themselves. Veiled harlots and maidservants shall have their garments seized and 50 blows inflicted on them and bitumen poured on their heads", "If a woman whose husband is dead on the death of her husband do not go out from her house, if her husband did not leave her anything, she shall dwell in the house of one of her sons. The sons of her husband shall support her; her food and her drink, as for a fiancee whom they are courting, they shall agree to provide for her. If she be a second wife, and have no sons of her own, with one of her husband's sons she shall dwell and the group shall support her. If she have sons of her own, her own sons shall support her, and she shall do their work. But if there be one among the sons of her husband who marries her, the other sons need not support her", "If a man strike the wife of a man, in her first stage of pregnancy, and cause her to drop that which is in her, it is a crime; two talents of lead he shall pay", "If a man strike a harlot and cause her to drop that which is in her, blows for blows they shall lay upon him; he shall make restitution for a life", "If a woman of her own accord drop that which is in her, they shall prosecute her, they shall convict her, they shall crucify her, they shall not bury her. If she die from dropping that which is in her, they shall crucify her, they shall not bury her", "If a virgin of her own accord give herself to a man, the man shall take oath, against his wife they shall not draw nigh. Threefold the price of a virgin the ravisher shall pay. The father shall do with his daughter what he pleases", and "Unless it is forbidden in the tablets, a man may strike his wife, pull her hair, her ear he may bruise or pierce. He commits no misdeed thereby."

10th–6th century BC

- Law of Moses: Some of the Law of Moses concerning women was as such: In the Mosaic law, for monetary matters, women's and men's rights were almost exactly equal. A woman was entitled to her own private property, including land, livestock, slaves, and servants. A woman had the right to inherit whatever anyone bequeathed to her as a death gift, and in the absence of sons would inherit everything. A woman could likewise bequeath her belongings to others as a death gift. Upon dying intestate, a woman's property would be inherited by her children if she had them, her husband if she was married, or her father if she were single. A woman could sue in court and did not need a male to represent her. In some situations, women actually had more rights than men. For example, captive women had to be ransomed prior to any male captives. Even though sons inherited property, they had a responsibility to support their mother and sisters from the estate, and had to ensure that both mother and sisters were taken care of prior to their being able to benefit from the inheritance, and if that wiped out the estate, the boys had to supplement their income from elsewhere. When it came to specific religious or sacramental activities, women had fewer opportunities or privileges than men. For example, in monetary or capital cases women could not serve as witnesses. A woman could not serve as a kohen in the Temple. A woman could not serve as queen regnant, the monarch had to be male. A divorce could only be granted by the husband, upon which time she would receive the Ketubah and the return of significant portions of her dowry. The vow of an unmarried girl between the ages of 12 years and 12 years and six months might be nullified by her father and the vow of a wife that affected marital obligations may be annulled by her husband; the guilt or innocence of a wife accused of adultery might be tested through the Sotah process, although this only was successful if the husband was innocent of adultery, and daughters could inherit only in the absence of sons.

=== Antiquity ===
7th century BC

- Locrian Code, Locris: Some of the laws of the Code were:

A free-born woman may not be accompanied by more than one female slave, unless she is drunk; she may not leave the city during the night, unless she is planning to commit adultery; she may not wear gold jewelry or a garment with a purple border, unless she is a courtesan.

5th century BC

- Gortyn (Gortyn Code, also called the Great Code): Some of the laws of the Code were: The code dictates higher fines for adultery committed within the household of the female's father, husband or brother, as opposed to another location. Fines also depend on whether the woman has previously committed adultery. The fines are levied against the male involved in the adultery, not the female. The code does not provide for the punishment of the female. Divorced women are entitled to any property that they brought to the marriage and half of the joint income if derived from her property. The code also provides for a portion of the household property. The code stipulates that any children conceived before the divorce but born after the divorce fall under the custody of the father. If the father does not accept the child, it reverts to the mother. Although the husband manages the majority of the family property, the wife's property is still delineated. If the wife dies, the husband becomes the trustee to her property and may take no action on it without the consent of her children. In the case of remarriage, the first wife's property immediately comes into her children's possession. If the wife dies childless, her property reverts to her blood relatives. If the husband dies with children, the property is held in trust by the wife for the children. If the children are of age upon their father's death, the property is divided between the children, with males receiving all of the land. If the husband dies without any children, the wife is compelled to remarry. Adopted children receive all the inheritance rights of natural children and are considered legitimate heirs in all cases, but women are not allowed to adopt children.

451 BC
Rome: The Roman Twelve Tables has three sections that pertain to women and concern estates and guardianship, ownership and possession, and religion, which give a basic understanding as to the legal rights of women.

- Table V (Estates and Guardianship): "Female heirs should remain under guardianship even when they have attained the age of majority, but exception is made for the Vestal Virgins."
- Table VI (Ownership and Possession): "Where a woman, who has not been united to a man in marriage, lives with him for an entire year without an interruption of three nights, she shall pass into his power as his legal wife."
- Table X (Religion): "Women shall not during a funeral lacerate their faces, or tear their cheeks with their nails; nor shall they utter loud cries bewailing the dead."

One of the aspects highlighted in the Twelve Tables is a woman's legal status and standing in society. Women were considered to be a form of guardianship similar to that of minors, and sections on ownership and possession give off the impression that women were considered to be akin to a piece of real estate or property due to the use of terms such as "ownership" and "possession".

215 BC

- Rome: The Lex Oppia was established; it forbade any woman to possess more than half an ounce of gold, to wear a multi-colored garment (particularly those trimmed in purple), or to ride in an animal-drawn vehicle in the city or any town or within a mile thereof, except in the case of public religious festivals.

About 200 BC

- India: The Manusmriti legal text offers an internally inconsistent and conflicting perspective on women's rights. The text, for example, declares that a marriage cannot be dissolved by a woman or a man, in verse 8.101–8.102. Yet, the text, in other sections, allows either to dissolve the marriage. For example, verses 9.72–9.81 allow the man or the woman to get out of a fraudulent marriage or an abusive marriage, and remarry; the text also provides legal means for a woman to remarry when her husband has been missing or has abandoned her. It preaches chastity to widows such as in verses 5.158–5.160, opposes a woman marrying someone outside her own social class as in verses 3.13–3.14. In other verses, such as 2.67–2.69 and 5.148–5.155, Manusmriti preaches that as a girl, she should obey and seek protection of her father, as a young woman her husband, and as a widow her son; and that a woman should always worship her husband as a god. In verses 3.55–3.56, Manusmriti also declares that "women must be honored and adorned", and "where women are revered, there the gods rejoice; but where they are not, no sacred rite bears any fruit". Elsewhere, in verses 5.147–5.148, states Olivelle, the text declares, "a woman must never seek to live independently". Simultaneously, states Olivelle, the text presupposes numerous practices such a marriages outside varna, such as between a Brahmin man and a Shudra woman in verses 9.149–9.157, a widow getting pregnant with a child of a man she is not married to in verses 9.57–9.62, marriage where a woman in love elopes with her man, and then grants legal rights in these cases such as property inheritance rights in verses 9.143–9.157, and the legal rights of the children so born. The text also presumes that a married woman may get pregnant by a man other than her husband, and dedicates verses 8.31–8.56 to conclude that the child's custody belongs to the woman and her legal husband, and not to the man she got pregnant with. Manusmriti provides a woman with property rights to six types of property in verses 9.192–9.200. These include those she received at her marriage, or as gift when she eloped or when she was taken away, or as token of love before marriage, or as gifts from her biological family, or as received from her husband subsequent to marriage, and also from inheritance from deceased relatives. Flavia Agnes states that Manusmriti is a complex commentary from women's rights perspective, and the British colonial era codification of women's rights based on it for Hindus, and from Islamic texts for Muslims, picked and emphasized certain aspects while it ignored other sections. This construction of personal law during the colonial era created a legal fiction around Manusmriti's historic role as a scripture in matters relating to women in South Asia.

195 BC

- Rome: The Lex Oppia was repealed.

42 BC

- In 42 B.C., nearly all of Rome's state-sponsored military legions, which were under the command of triumvirs Gaius Julius Caesar Octavianus, Marcus Aemilius Lepidus, and Marcus Antonius, were at war with the assassins of Julius Caesar (Decimus Junius Brutus Albinus, Marcus Junius Brutus and Gaius Cassius Longinus). To fund the ongoing war, the triumvirs had resorted to selling the property of wealthy citizens killed by proscription; however, this source of revenue did not prove to be lucrative enough, and the triumvirs voted to place a tax on Rome's 1400 most wealthy women. Later that year, Hortensia delivered a speech against the tax, and the next day, the triumvirs reduced the number of women subject to the tax to 400, and instead, compensated for the loss of revenue by forcing male property-owners to lend money to the state and contribute to war expenses.

18 BC

- Roman law Lex Julia de adulteriis coercendis implemented by Augustus Caesar in 18 BC permitted the murder of daughters and their lovers who committed adultery at the hands of their fathers and also permitted the murder of the adulterous wife's lover at the hand of her husband.

=== Middle ages ===
5th to 8th century

- Brehon Law, Ireland: Women, like men, were Brehons. Brehon Laws have a reputation among modern scholars as rather progressive in their treatment of women, with some describing the law as providing for equality between the sexes. However, the laws generally portray a patriarchal and patrilineal society in which the rules of inheritance were based on agnatic descent. It has sometimes been assumed that the patriarchal elements of the law are the result of influence by canon law or continental practice displacing an older, more egalitarian ancient Celtic tradition, but this is based mainly on conjecture and there is little hard evidence to support such claims. Cáin Adomnáin, a Christian law, promulgated by the Synod of Birr in 697, sought to raise the status of women of that era, although the actual effect is unknown. Under Cáin Adomnáin, "whoever slays a woman... his right hand and his left foot shall be cut off before death, and then he shall die," and if a woman committed murder, arson, or theft from a church, she was to be set adrift in a boat with one paddle and a container of gruel. This left the judgment up to God and avoided violating the proscription against killing a woman. Also under Cáin Adomnáin, there were sanctions against rape, impugning the chastity of a noblewoman and women having to take part in warfare. Much of it repeated traditional Irish laws. Although Irish society under the Brehon Laws was male-dominated, women had greater freedom, independence and rights to property than in other European societies of the time. Men and women held their property separately. The marriage laws were very complex. For example, there were scores of ways of combining households and properties and then dividing the property and its increase when disputes arose. Divorce was provided for on a number of grounds (that ultimately deal with the inability to have a child), after which property was divided according to what contribution each spouse had made to the household. A husband was legally permitted to hit his wife to "correct" her, but if the blow left a mark she was entitled to the equivalent of her bride-price in compensation and could, if she wished, divorce him. Property of a household could not be disposed of without the consent of both spouses. However, under Western Catholic church law, women were still largely subject to their fathers or husbands and were not normally permitted to act as witnesses, their testimony being considered "biased and dishonest".

Circa 500

- Franks: The Salic law, also called the Salian law, was the ancient Frankish civil law code compiled around AD 500 by the first Frankish King, Clovis. It remained the basis of Frankish law throughout the early medieval period, and influenced future European legal systems. The best-known tenet of the old law is the principle of exclusion of women from inheritance of thrones, fiefs and other property. Concerning the inheritance of land, Salic law said: "But of Salic land no portion of the inheritance shall come to a woman: but the whole inheritance of the land shall come to the male sex", or, in another transcript: "concerning terra Salica no portion or inheritance is for a woman but all the land belongs to members of the male sex who are brothers." The law merely prohibited women from inheriting ancestral "Salic land"; this prohibition did not apply to other property (such as personal property); and under Chilperic I sometime around the year 570, the law was actually amended to permit inheritance of land by a daughter if a man had no surviving sons. (This amendment, depending on how it is applied and interpreted, offers the basis for either Semi-Salic succession or male-preferred primogeniture, or both.)

Circa 524

- Byzantine Empire: Circa 524, Byzantine emperor Justin I passed a new law, decreeing that reformed actresses could thereafter legally marry outside their rank. The same law stated that daughters of these actresses would also be free to marry a man of any rank.

Circa 570

- Neustria: Under Chilperic I sometime around the year 570, the law was amended to permit inheritance of land by a daughter if a man had no surviving sons. (This amendment, depending on how it is applied and interpreted, offers the basis for either Semi-Salic succession or male-preferred primogeniture, or both.)

581–1911

- Imperial China: From the Sui dynasty onwards in Imperial China, women could not hold property directly and, for land to stay in the same family, it had to pass between male heirs following the rule of primogeniture.

1215

- England: The Magna Carta banned forced marriage of widows, declared the rights of a widow to receive promptly her dowry and inheritance, and, addressing Jewish money lending, stated that a widow and children should be provided for before paying an inherited debt.

1290-1292

- Scotland: In dispute over the Scottish succession, 1290–1292, the Bruce family pleaded tanistry and proximity of blood, whereas Balliol argued his claim based on primogeniture. The arbiter, Edward I of England, decided in favor of primogeniture. But later, the Independence Wars reverted the situation in favor of the Bruce, due to political exigency.

1317

- France: Philip V of France laid down the principle that Joan, as a woman, could not inherit the throne of France.

1325 - 1827

- Sardinia: The Carta de Logu (meaning Charter of Law) was in effect in Sardinia from 1395 until 1827. One notable provision of the Code is that it gave daughters and sons the same inheritance rights. As well, it also declared that rape could be recompensed through marriage only if the woman who was raped agreed to marry her rapist, and even if she did the Code declared that the rapist still had to either pay a large fine to the Senate or have his foot cut off (his choice). If she did not agree to marry him, he had to give her a dowry that suited her social status, so that she could marry someone else, and he still had to either pay a large fine to the Senate or have his foot cut off (his choice). As well, these punishments were not affected by whether or not the woman in question was betrothed.

1328

- France: In 1328, Philip VI of France's first cousin King Charles IV died without a son, leaving his widow Jeanne of Évreux pregnant. Philip was one of the two chief claimants to the throne of France. The other was King Edward III of England, who was the son of Charles's sister Isabella of France and his closest male relative. The Estates General had decided 20 years earlier that women could not inherit the throne of France. The question arose as to whether Isabella should have been able to transmit a claim that she herself did not possess. The assemblies of the French barons and prelates and the University of Paris decided that males who derive their right to inheritance through their mother should be excluded according to Salic law. As Philip was the eldest grandson of King Philip III of France, through the male line, he became regent instead of Edward, who was a matrilineal grandson of King Philip IV and great-grandson of King Philip III.

1426-1430

- Korea: Sejong the Great enacted a law that granted government nobi women 100 days of maternity leave after childbirth, which, in 1430, was lengthened by one month before childbirth.

1474

- The earliest documented prosecution of gender-based/targeted crimes is from 1474 when the German knight Sir Peter von Hagenbach was convicted for rapes committed by his troops. However, the trial was only successful in indicting Sir von Hagenbach with the charge of rape because the war in which the rapes occurred was "undeclared" and thus the rapes were considered illegal only because of this.

1487

- A statute, the Abduction of Women Act 1487 (3 Hen. 7. c. 2), entitled 'An Acte agaynst taking awaye of Women agaynst theire Wills' made abduction and forced marriage (or rape) of property-owning women or heiresses for the purposes of financial gain a felony in England. Those who aided and abetted the abduction or imprisonment were also guilty of a felony in England.

=== Early modern era ===
1536-1564

- Calvinist Geneva: Citing Biblical injunctions (particularly Exodus 22:16–17 and Deuteronomy 22:25–30), Calvinist Geneva (1536–1564) permitted a single woman's father to consent to her marriage to her rapist, after which the husband would have no right to divorce; the woman had no explicitly stated separate right to refuse. The only consequence that the rapist faced was to pay a fine to the father of the woman that he raped.

1540

- England: In 1540, Henry VIII of England granted the charter for the Company of Barber-Surgeons; while this led to the specialization of healthcare professions (i.e. surgeons and barbers), women were barred from professional practice.

1570

- Portugal: Abortion was established as illegal in Sebastian of Portugal's Regimento de Quadrilheiros (1570), during the Aviz dynasty period.

End of 16th century

- Sir Edward Coke formulates the "born alive rule", in common law, which holds that various criminal laws, such as homicide and assault, apply only to a child that is "born alive".

1600s

- United States, Massachusetts: A 17th-century law in Massachusetts announced that women would be subjected to the same treatment as witches if they lured men into marriage via the use of high-heeled shoes.

1629

- Japan: Women's kabuki, called onna-kabuki, was banned in Japan in 1629 for being too erotic. However, some Japanese kabuki troupes today use female actors.

1641

- Massachusetts Bay Colony: The 1641 Body of Liberties of the Massachusetts Bay colonists declared that a married woman should be "free from bodilie correction or stripes by her husband."

1662

- Virginia colony: The Virginia colony passed a law incorporating the principle of partus sequitur ventrem, ruling that children of enslaved mothers would be born into slavery, regardless of their father's race or status. This was in contradiction to English common law for English subjects, which based a child's status on that of the father.

1664

- Maryland: Maryland declared any Englishwoman who married a slave had to live as a slave of her husband’s master.

Late 1600s

- Japan: In 1682, shōgun Tokugawa Tsunayoshi ordered his censors and police to raise the living standard of the people. Soon, among other things, prostitution was banned, and waitresses could not be employed in tea houses.

1683

- Denmark: The Danish Code of 1683 called for the execution of any unmarried woman who terminated her pregnancy.

1687

- Norway: Law in Norway which, following the Danish rules of that time, defined unmarried women as minor.

=== 18th-century ===
1700

- Monaco and Spain: Male-preference primogeniture is currently practised in succession to the thrones of Monaco and Spain (before 1700 and since 1830).

1712

- Croatia: The Croatian Pragmatic Sanction of 1712, passed by the Diet of the Habsburg Kingdom of Croatia, allowed the Croatian throne to pass to the female line of the House of Habsburg.

1713

- The Habsburg hereditary possessions: The Pragmatic Sanction of 1713 (Latin: Sanctio Pragmatica, German: Pragmatische Sanktion) was an edict issued by Charles VI, Holy Roman Emperor, on 19 April 1713 to ensure that the Habsburg hereditary possessions, which included the Archduchy of Austria, the Kingdom of Hungary, the Kingdom of Croatia, the Kingdom of Bohemia, the Duchy of Milan, the Kingdom of Naples, the Kingdom of Sardinia and the Austrian Netherlands, could be inherited by a daughter if there were no male heirs.

1714

- Denmark: The Midwife Regulation of 1714 (Jordemoderforordningen) extended the death penalty to midwives who induced abortions, though it is unclear how often the penalty was effectuated. A 1760 case involving the use of illegal abortion drugs was settled administratively with a fine; a 1772 court case over a woman who died following the illegal administering of drugs likewise led only to a fine; and towards the end of the century, death sentences were routinely commuted.

1718

- Russia: Gender segregation is banned.
- Sweden: Female taxpaying members of the cities' guilds are allowed to stand for election during the Age of Liberty; this right is banned (for local elections) in 1758 and (general elections) in 1771.
- United States: In the Province of Pennsylvania (now the U.S. state of Pennsylvania) married women are allowed to own and manage property in their own name during the incapacity of their spouse.

1720

- Sweden: The Guild Regulation of 1720 secures the right of women to apply for a permit to work within all guild professions, trades and handicrafts.

1722

- Russia: Ban against forced marriages.

1723

- Hungary: The Pragmatic Sanction of 1723 passed the Hungarian Parliament, accepting female inheritance in the Kingdom of Hungary. Charles VI had permitted Hungary to revert to elective monarchy should he die without a male heir; this instrument signaled the Hungarian parliament's acceptance of his daughter as his choice of successor.

1734

- Sweden: In the Civil Code of 1734, men are banned from selling the property of their wife without her consent, and both spouses regardless of gender are secured the right to divorce upon adultery, while the innocent party are secured custody of the children.
- Sweden: The Civil Code of 1734 formally introduced the death penalty for abortion, but there is no confirmed case in which this sentence was actually carried out: the attention was focused on infanticide rather than abortion, and the court cases were few.
- Sweden: Unmarried women, normally under the guardianship of their closest male relative, are granted the right to be declared of legal majority by dispensation from the monarch.

1741

- Sweden: The requirement of guild membership for innkeepers is dropped, effectively opening the profession to women.

1749

- Sweden: Women are given the right to engage in the trade of knick-knacks, and the permit to be active as a street seller (Månglare), a very common profession for poor women, are to be foremost issued in favor of women in need of self-support.

1753

- Russia: Married women granted separate economy.

1755

- France: A new law is established in France banning women from dental studies.

1758

- Sweden: The right of female taxpaying members of the cities' guilds to stand for election is banned (for local elections) in 1758 and (general elections) in 1771.

1765

- England: Post-quickening abortion is no longer considered homicide in England, but William Blackstone confirms the "born alive rule" and calls it "a very heinous misdemeanor".

1771

- Sweden: The right of female taxpaying members of the cities' guilds to stand for election is banned for general elections in 1771.

1772

- Sweden: The permit to engage in tobacco trade is foremost to be granted to (widowed and married) women in need to support themselves.

1776

- France: Female tailors are allowed into the guild of tailors.

1778

- Sweden: Barnamordsplakatet; unmarried women are allowed to leave their home town to give birth anonymously and have the birth registered anonymously, to refrain from answering any questions about the birth and, if they choose to keep their child, to have their unmarried status not mentioned in official documents to avoid social embarrassment. This was due to the first Infanticide Act.

1779

- Spain: The guild restrictions which prevented females from holding certain professions are abolished.

1784

- Spain: Women are by royal decree allowed to accept any profession compatible with their "sex, dignity and strength".

1791

- France: Equal inheritance rights (abolished in 1804).

1792

- France: Divorce is legalized for both sexes. (Abolished for women in 1804.)
- France: Local women-units of the defense army are founded in several cities; although the military was never officially open to women, about eight thousand women were estimated to have served openly in the French armée in local troops (but not in the battle fields) between 1792 and 1794, but women were officially barred from the armée in 1795.

1793

- France: Article 326 of the Code Civil legalized both anonymous and confidential births.

1795

- France: Women were officially barred from the armée in 1795.

1797

- Russia: Agnatic-cognatic primogeniture, which allows women to succeed only at the extinction of all the male descendants in the male line, was the law of Russia under the Pauline Laws of 1797.

1798

- Sweden: Married business women are given legal majority and juridical responsibility within the affairs of their business enterprise, despite being otherwise under guardianship of their spouse.

== See also ==
- 19th century
- 20th century
- Legal rights of women in history
- Timeline of reproductive rights legislation
- Timeline of women's legal rights in the United States (other than voting)
- Timeline of women's legal rights (other than voting)
