= Rower woman =

Swedish ferry-woman

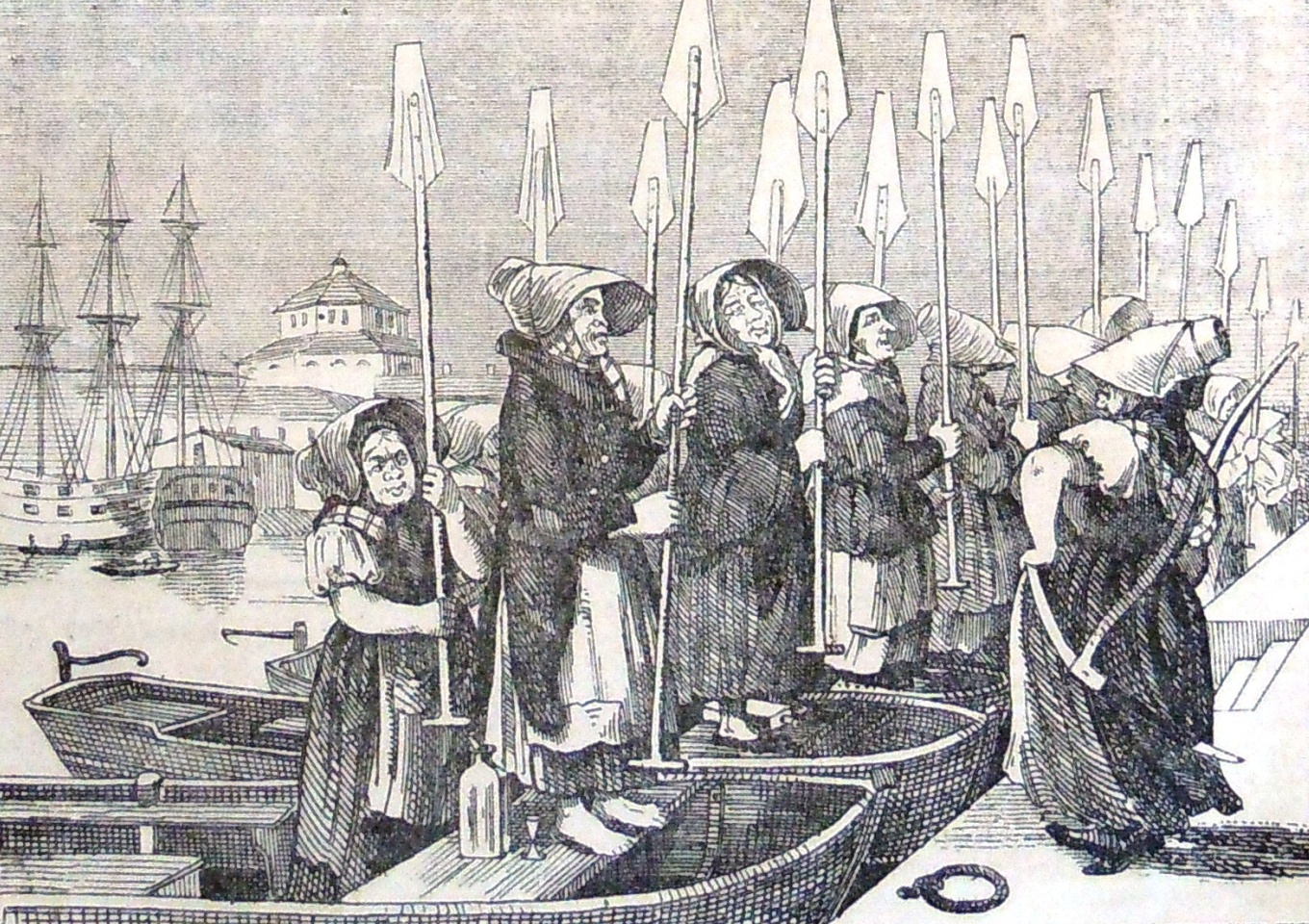
Humorous drawing of rower women in Stockholm in their typical "weather hoods", preparing to battle the employed ladies from Dalarna and their fancy paddle-wheeled boats, published in 1855.

Rower woman (Swedish: Roddarmadam; lit. "rower madam") was a female profession in Stockholm, Sweden, from the 15th century until the early 20th century. It consisted of women who ran a form of early water taxi; rowing people between the islands of Stockholm, to and from the islands of the Stockholm archipelago, as well as to and from places around Lake Mälaren on the other side of Stockholm.

== History ==
The Stockholm rower women are mentioned in text from the 15th century, and in 1638 they formed a special group within the Swedish ferrymen guild. They handled most of the traffic over the waters of the capital, working in teams of two, taking passengers between its islands, into Lake Mälaren, and to and from islands in the Stockholm archipelago. They could be either married or unmarried, and they inherited their boats from mother to daughter, or bought them from retired colleagues. They were businesswomen famed for their blunt manner and coarse language. So much so, that in 1759, a law was introduced which specified that they must be sober and maintain a civil language. They were very visible because of their large "weather hoods", a special hat very suited when rowing in bad weather.

In the 1690s, a visiting Italian was impressed by the strength and great speed of the rower women in Stockholm. In 1763, Carl Michael Bellman attracted attention when he came into conflict with one of the rower women and managed to win the argument. During his visit to Sweden in 1787, Francisco de Miranda described the rower women as: "Good women who row like devils!"

During the 19th century, the rower women found increasing competition. Following Fabriks och Handtwerksordning in 1846, which abolished all guild privileges and allowed anyone to start business in any sector of society, a private company acquired a license in 1848 for ferry traffic in Stockholm with boats propelled by hand-operated paddle wheels instead of oars, worked by employed women from Dalarna, who were dressed in their local folk costumes and taught to be nice and courteous to their customers. A few years later steam boats started to take over the business from both types of boats and women.

In 1856, there were 96 rowing boats run by women, with the capacity of transporting 20-25 people in each boat. In 1875, when the rower woman profession was formally abolished (although they were allowed to continue their trade), there were five rowing boat stations in Stockholm, with a total of 23 rowing boats run by women. The number continued to diminish thereafter, and nobody knows exactly when the last rower woman retired. However, according to the Stockholm history author Per Anders Fogelström, the activity may very well have continued up to World War I.

== See also ==
- Gondola
- Water taxi
- Månglare
- Mursmäcka
