= Augusta Dorothea Eklund =

Augusta Dorothea Eklund (2 September 1826 – 31 December 1895, in Stockholm) known in history by her sobriquet Trasfröken ('Miss Rags'), was a famous homeless street peddler and eccentric in Stockholm. A well-known part of Stockholm street life in the second half of the 19th century, she was the subject of contemporary folklore, mentioned in contemporary diaries, memoirs and media.

== Life ==
Eklund was born to a shoemaker and a corset maker in Stockholm. After the death of her parents, she supported two younger sisters Ida and Karolina by her late mother's trade: that of a corset seamstress. After one of her sisters died and the other one left home to work in the theater, Eklund was affected by depression, which eventually reduced her to a homeless destitute.

She lived in various temporary huts she built herself around the city, and supported herself by selling needles for a price above their worth from door to door as månglare: reportedly, she managed to sell because she often lost her temper when the people she offered her needles to attempted to close the door without purchasing any.

"Trasfröken" became a well-known part of Stockholm folklore through her appearance and eccentric behavior. She sometimes dressed in rags, and other times in dresses which appeared to be of some worth. In 1873, for example, Selma Lagerlöf described her dressed in an elegant but dirty white summer dress, similar to a wedding dress in the middle of the winter. It was also noted that she carried her possessions – that is her cookery equipment – with her everywhere, as they were not left in peace in her huts. She was reportedly routinely harassed by children. In folklore, she was rumored to have become insane of sorrow after having been seduced by a man from the aristocracy in the home where she once worked as a lady's companion. She was aware of this myth, and sometimes supported it by shouting it out in public.

In October 1894, she was found sick in one of her huts and brought to the St Eric Poor House, where she died on New Year's Eve 1895.

== See also ==
- Bakelse-Jeanna
- Gumman Strömberg
