= Charlotta Christina Boberg =

Swedish businesswoman (born 1816)

- Born: 1816
- Died: 1898
- Occupation: Businesswoman

Charlotta Christina Boberg (1816-1898), was a Swedish businesswoman who sold fruit and flowers as a månglare.

Charlotta Christina Boberg was the orphaned foster daughter of her maternal aunt Maria Boberg. Her aunt was a registered månglare and sold fruit, but her business had expanded beyond what was expected of a månglare. Boberg assisted her aunt in the business, starting from the age of nine. After the death of her aunt, she applied for a permit and inherited the business.

In 1840, she applied to the city authorities for a permit to trade as a månglare. The månglare-permit was granted by the city authorities to people (foremost married women) who could argue that they needed to support themselves, and there where regulations to prevent a månglare from expanding their business beyond what was needed for self support. Like her aunt, she belonged to the minority of månglare who managed to become wealthy on her business. Similar to her aunt, she was not addressed with the title månglare (which was her official and formal profession), but as a fruit merchant.

She expanded her business to become one of the biggest fruit- and flower shops in Stockholm. With the Decree of Extended Freedom of Trade (Sweden) of 1864, resulting in the abolition of the månglare profession, her business was also formally freed from all the restrictions belonging to the månglare profession, and her case belonged to the most notable examples of how the former månglare could achieve success when the månglare restrictions where abolished.
