= Mursmäcka =

Historical Swedish construction worker

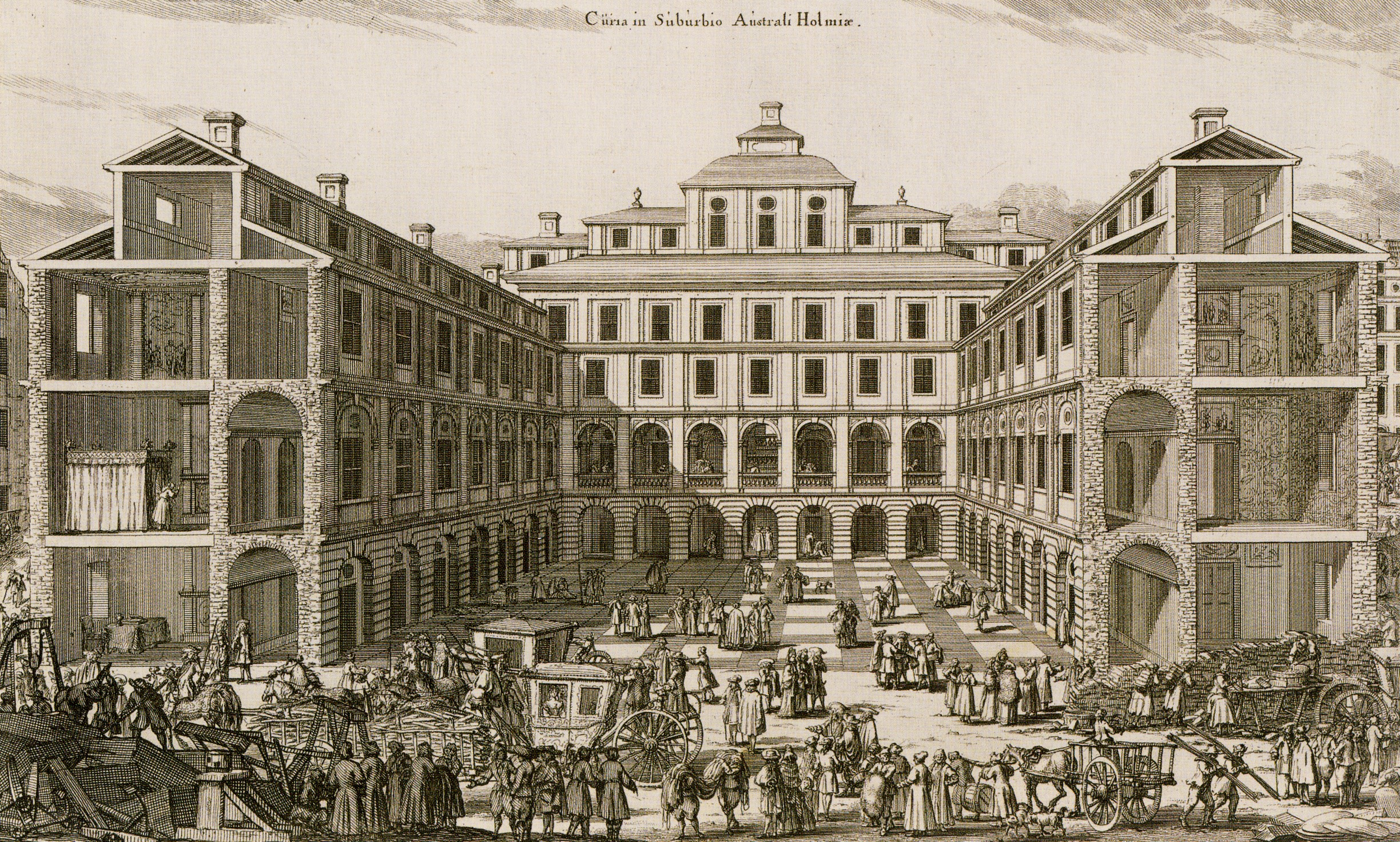
Construction work in Stockholm 1691; likely the first time the Mursmäckas are depicted

Mursmäcka, also called bruksmäcka or only smäcka, was an historical profession for women in Sweden. A mursmäcka was a female construction worker with the task of handing mortar during construction work. The profession is recorded from at least 1691 (though it is not confirmed by name until the 1830s) and discontinued in 1922. This was a very hard but common job for a poor uneducated woman during the 19th century, particularly in Stockholm. In July 1888, the Mursmäcka of Stockholm performed a great strike action which attracted considerable attention in contemporary Sweden.

== History ==
It is unknown when the profession was first practiced. The first illustration of female construction workers in Sweden are from 1691, and they are frequently mentioned in the payrolls in the 18th century. The name Mursmäcka is first recorded in the 1830s, when they were apparently already long established as a regular part of a construction site work force. During the 19th century, they were common in all cities in Sweden, especially in Stockholm, where there was a building boom in the latter half of that century.

Their task was to manufacture the mortar and carry it to the bricklayers. The work was very hard, badly reputed and, though the salary was possible to live on, it was very low. According to an investigation from 1897, most of the women active in the profession were uneducated destitute unmarried women, often unmarried mothers. As there was very little construction work during winter time, the mursmäckas, just as their male colleagues, were forced to live on other work, in their case often charring.

In 1888, the mursmäckas launched a strike in Stockholm to raise their salary. This attracted a great deal of attention because of their gender, and the newspapers called it The Women's Strike. They succeeded and their salary was raised, though it was lowered again just a few years later. Mursmäckas became members of the Bricklayers' Union after it was founded in 1897. In 1904, a new work regulation was enforced in which an entire construction work team was paid according to how much they could work, which in effect meant that they could raise their salaries and split it among them if they could keep up a high work speed. The consequence was that the male workers became less willing to include women in their teams, as they doubted that they could keep the same work speed as their male colleagues, which because of the new regulation would affect the income of the whole team. This meant that the mursmäckas had to start to compete with male rivals performing the same tasks as in the work team.

During World War I, no buildings were erected, and when the war was over and there was a great deal of people unemployed, male workers were favored over females and the tasks previously belonging to women in construction work teams were given to men, thereby ending the profession of mursmäcka. The last mursmäcka retired in 1922.

== See also ==
- Månglare
- Rower women
