= Maria Boberg =

Maria Boberg (1784 – 27 December 1839) was a Swedish businesswoman.

She was the daughter of the master shoemaker Johan Boberg (died in 1799) and Catharina Boberg (died in 1828). She was the sister of Regina Catharina (who possibly died of cholera in 1834), Johan Gustav and Johanna Christina. Her mother Catharina was a månglare for a period of six years and Maria Boberg then assisted her mother in her business. In 1800, Catharina had a daughter named Eva Elisabeth (1800–1835) with her late husband's journeyman Magnus Lindblad, however Magnus ended up instead marrying Maria Boberg, who was then pregnant with their daughter Anna Catharina.

She became a fruit merchant in Stockholm. She applied for a permit to trade as a månglare in 1802. The månglare-permit was granted by the city authorities to people (foremost married women) who could argue that they needed to support themselves. Maria Boberg fulfilled the requirements because she was already her mother's assistant and her husband's income was not enough to support her, her children, her mother as well as her four siblings; the following years she also had another daughter. In 1802, she opened her mångleri in a booth at 18 Fredsgatan, selling fruit, fowl, lobster, Mettwurst, eggs, berries, chicken, gingerbread, baked goods and nuts.

Regulations were in place to prevent a månglare from expanding their business beyond what was needed for self-support. Maria Boberg belonged to the minority of månglare who managed to become wealthy on her business. It was uncommon for a månglare to attain her level of success. A sign of this was that Maria Boberg was not addressed with the title månglare (which was her official and formal profession), but as a fruit merchant. She was also addressed as fru in court, which was at the time typically reserved for noblewomen. She acquired a house with eight apartments, renting out apartments to noblemen employed at the royal court.

Maria Boberg filed for divorce in 1817, as Magnus had allegedly left home to live with another woman. Although the claims of infidelity could not be proven, Maria was still able to secure a divorce on the basis of his prison sentence, as he was sentenced to one year at Karlskrona fort for his seventh offence of drunkenness. She died foster mother to three orphaned grandchildren and her niece Charlotta Christina Boberg, who was also her informal business associate and shop assistant. When she died, she left behind a house worth 28 000 riksdaler banco, personalty, cash and receivables amounting to 7 500 riksdaler banco. She left behind 100 riksdaler banco to her sister Eva's child and 666 riksdaler banco to Charlotta Christina in addition to the inheritance for her children. As her heir, Charlotta Christina took over the business entity.
