= Timeline of feminism in the United States =

This is a timeline of feminism in the United States. It contains feminist and antifeminist events. It should contain events within the ideologies and philosophies of feminism and antifeminism. It should, however, not contain material about changes in women's legal rights: for that, see Timeline of women's legal rights in the United States (other than voting), or, if it concerns the right to vote, to Timeline of women's suffrage in the United States.

== 19th century ==
- 19th century: First-wave feminism was a period of feminist activity and thought that occurred during the 19th and early 20th century throughout the Western world, which includes the United States, and therefore began in the 19th century. It focused on legal issues, primarily on securing women's right to vote.

== 1960s ==
- 1960s: Radical feminism emerged in the United States. It is a perspective within feminism that calls for a radical reordering of society in which male supremacy is eliminated in all social and economic contexts; that said, radical feminists also recognize that women's experiences differ according to other divisions in society such as race and sexual orientation.
- 1963: The Feminine Mystique was published; it is a book written by Betty Friedan which is widely credited with starting the beginning of second-wave feminism in the United States. Second-wave feminism was a period of feminist activity and thought that began in the early 1960s in the United States, and spread throughout the Western world and beyond. In the United States the movement lasted through the early 1980s. Second-wave feminism built on first-wave feminism and broadened the scope of debate to include a wider range of issues: sexuality, family, domesticity, the workplace, reproductive rights, de facto inequalities, and official legal inequalities. First-wave feminism typically advocated for formal equality and second-wave feminism advocated for substantive equality. It was a movement focused on critiquing patriarchal or male-dominated institutions and cultural practices throughout society.

== 1970s ==
- Early 1970s: In its modern form, the Jewish feminist movement can be traced to the early 1970s in the United States. According to Judith Plaskow, the main grievances of early Jewish feminists were women's exclusion from the all-male prayer group or minyan, women's exemption from positive time-bound mitzvot (mitzvot meaning the 613 commandments given in the Torah at Mount Sinai and the seven rabbinic commandments instituted later, for a total of 620), and women's inability to function as witnesses and to initiate divorce in Jewish religious courts.

== 1980s ==
- 1980s: Difference feminism was developed by feminists in the 1980s, it is a term developed during the equality-versus-difference debate in American feminism to describe the view that men and women are different, but that no value judgment can be placed upon them and both sexes have equal moral status as persons.

== 1990s ==
- Early 1990s: Riot grrrl is an underground feminist punk movement that began during the early 1990s within the United States in Olympia, Washington, and the greater Pacific Northwest.
- 1992: Third-wave feminism is traced to Anita Hill's televised testimony in 1991 to an all-male all-white Senate Judiciary Committee that the judge Clarence Thomas had sexually harassed her. The term third wave is credited to Rebecca Walker, who responded to Thomas' appointment to the Supreme Court with an article in Ms. magazine, "Becoming the Third Wave" (1992). She wrote:

So I write this as a plea to all women, especially women of my generation: Let Thomas' confirmation serve to remind you, as it did me, that the fight is far from over. Let this dismissal of a woman's experience move you to anger. Turn that outrage into political power. Do not vote for them unless they work for us. Do not have sex with them, do not break bread with them, do not nurture them if they don't prioritize our freedom to control our bodies and our lives. I am not a post-feminism feminist. I am the Third Wave.

== See also ==
- Timeline of feminism
