= Månglare =

Historical profession

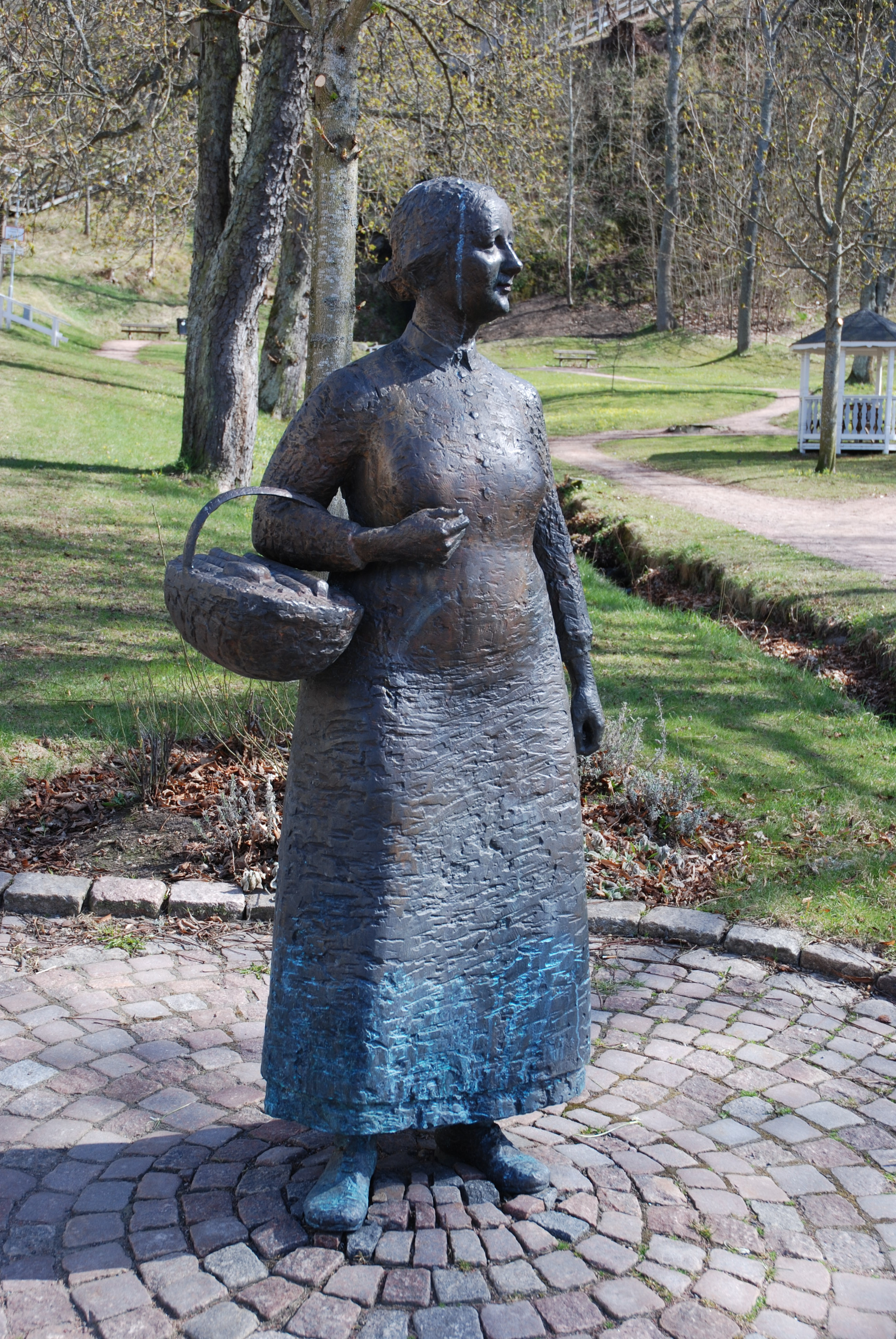
Amalia Eriksson – the Mother of the Polkagris— Lena Lervik (1997). The perhaps most famous of all månglare, Amalia Eriksson.

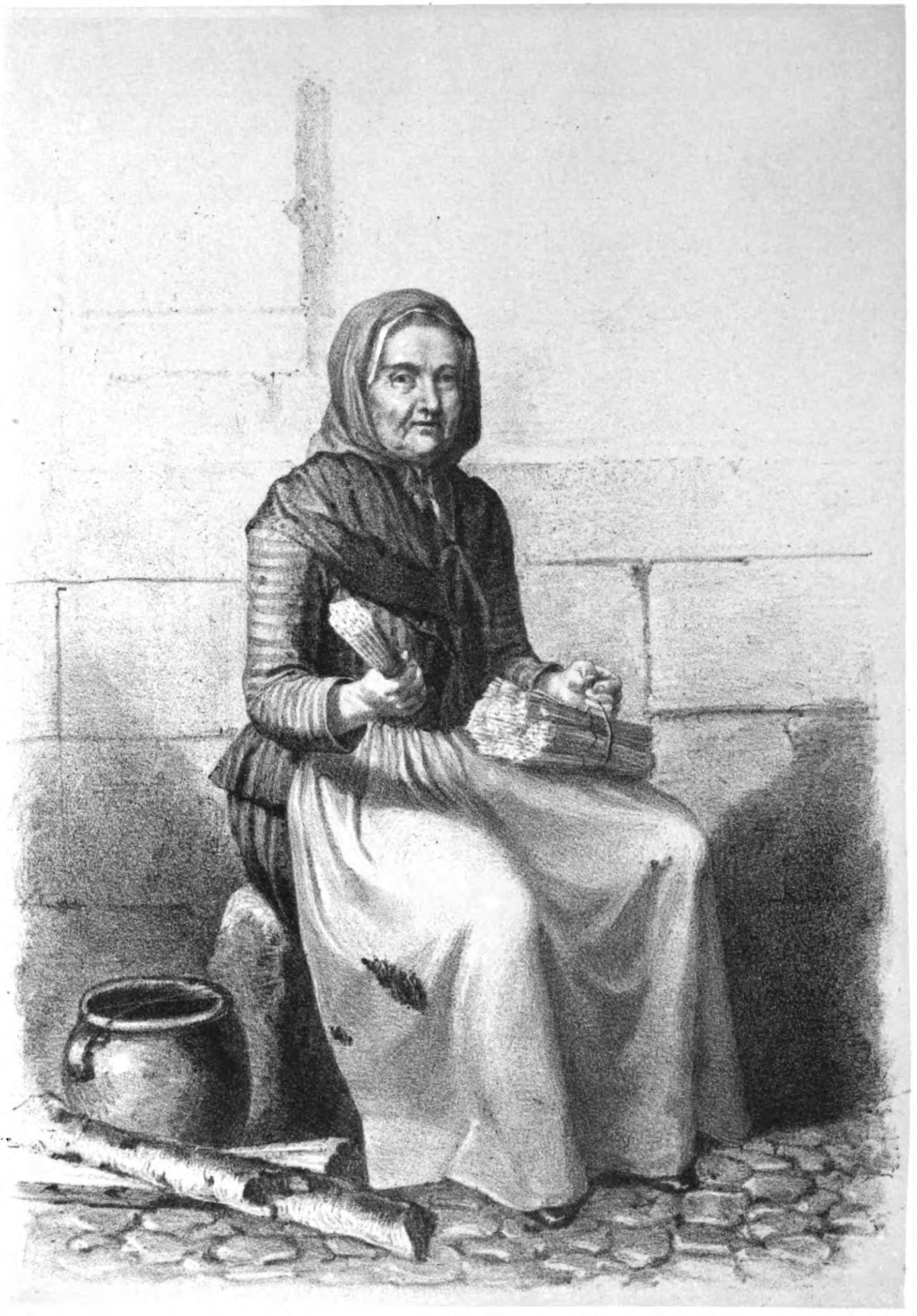
En svafvelsticksförsäljerska - Pehr Hilleström

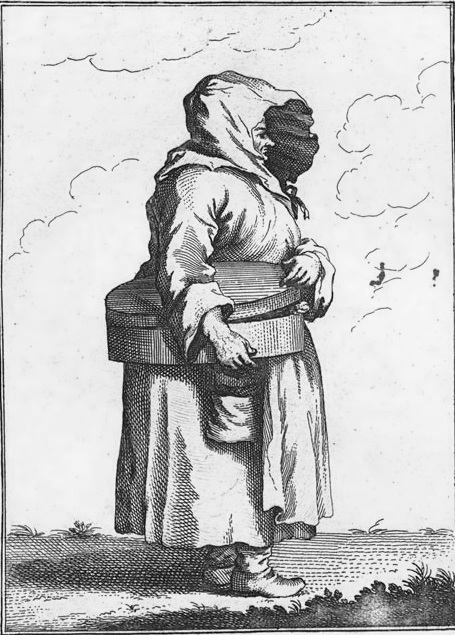
Bakelse-Jeanna in an 1820 book illustration. Copper plate engraving by Johan Gustaf Ruckman

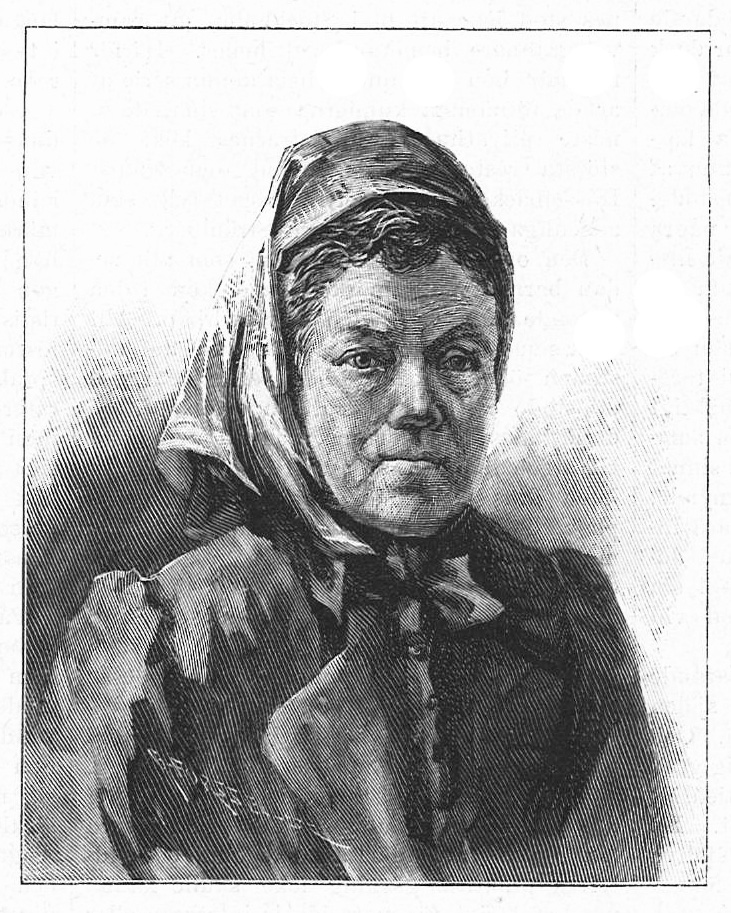
Johanna Strömberg Portrait

Månglare was a historical profession in Sweden. A female månglare was often called månglerska. A månglare was essentially a street vendor with permission from the city authorities to engage in trade without being a member of the Guild, which was otherwise a necessity for anyone wishing to engage in business in the city. The profession was dissolved along with the Guilds by the Decree of Extended Freedom of Trade (Sweden) of 1864.

== History ==
In the Middle Ages, the månglare were essentially the sales people who sold the goods of the merchants in the city markets. Since they were not member of the Guilds which normally had the trade monopoly in the cities, special regulations were introduced to avoid conflict between them and the Guilds. The Law of 1623 stated that the profession of månglare should be reserved for poor city people in need of supporting themselves.

The regulation of 1749 stipulated that a månglare permit should foremost be granted to poor urban women who could not otherwise support themselves. While the profession was never reserved for women, and male månglare always existed, women where in clear majority among the månglare from 1749 onward. The city authorities normally granted a månglare permit to a married woman whose husband was unable to support the family; a divorced woman; an abandoned wife; or a widow.

While it was not forbidden for an unmarried woman to apply for a månglare permit, the permit was essentially granted to women who could argue that they were in need of supportng themselwes and had no other way to do so, and since young unmarried women could always become domestic workers (the most common profession for any working woman), while married women were customarily never employed as maidservants, a young unmarried woman was less likely getting her application approved.

== Definition ==
A månglare was essentially engaged in small trade. There were three different categories of månglare:

- 1) "walking månglare", who walked the streets as street vendors selling their goods from baskets;
- 2) "sitting månglare", who sold their goods sitting behind a stand in the market place of the squares;
- 3) and finally "sale from shop", which described those månglare allowed to sell their goods indoors from an actual shop.

Månglare were primarily given permission to sell goods which were not included in the goods reserved by the Guilds. Typical goods sold by the månglare were fruit, birds, sea food, sausage, eggs, berries, nuts, chicken, cookies, cakes, sweets and pastries, non-valuable ornaments and decorations, knitted works, buttons, ribbons, cheap jewelry, sewing tools, collars, smaller clothing articles and second hand clothing and other used goods.

The månglare were given dispensation from the Guilds, and in exchange there were regulations preventing the månglare from growing too big. Månglare were not allowed to delegate their business and employ adult men or young women as assistants, which acted as a regulation preventing their business from expanding beyond what was needed to support the individual månglare. Despite these regulations, there are examples of månglare who achieved remarkable success and became rich through their business, such as Maria Boberg.

== Position ==
The Guilds were normally hostile toward the månglare because the månglare had been given a dispensation to conduct trades normally monopolised by the Guilds, and it was common with legal disputes between the Guilds and the månglare, in which the Guilds accused the månglare of having abused their dispensation: in these disputes, the Guilds were often hostile toward the månglare, while the city authorities normally took the side of the månglare if they were female, because of the limited professional opportunities of women, who would otherwise need to rely on charity or poor relief.

== Dissolution ==
The 1846 law Handelsordningen undermined the Guilds: from this year, a månglare permit was issued to anyone who applied for it and not only to on the strict grounds of a need of self support, and the månglare business were given more generous terms to expand.

In the Decree of Extended Freedom of Trade (Sweden) of 1864, both the Guilds as well as the profession of månglare was dissolved and free trade established, enabling anyone with sufficient funds to start a business and to expand it freely, and many successful former månglare, such as Charlotta Christina Boberg and Johanna Strömberg, became shop owners.

== In fiction ==
In the story Brenda Brave Helps Grandmother (original title: Kajsa Kavat), a 1950 story by Astrid Lindgren, the main character is the foster child of a månglerska.

== See also ==
- Mursmäcka
- Rower women
