= Bakelse-Jeanna =

Swedish pastry-seller

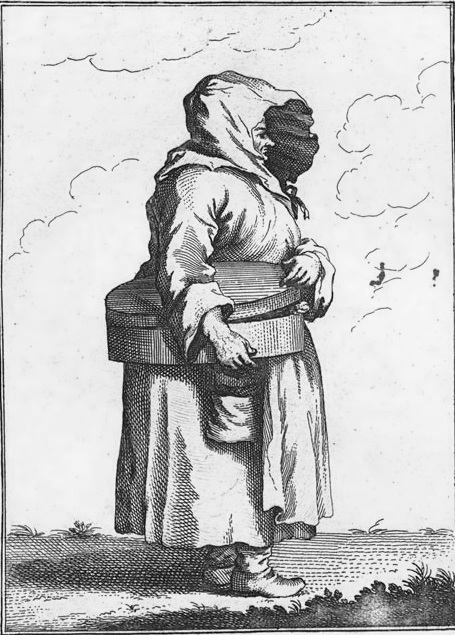
Bakelse-Jeanna in an 1820 book illustration. Copper plate engraving by Johan Gustaf Ruckman

Bakelse-Jeanna (1702–1788), was a Swedish pastry-seller, the name signifying "Pastry-Jeanna". She was a well known and distinctive character in Stockholm at that time, and often used as a figure within Swedish plays, songs and literature during the 18th and 19th centuries.

== Reality and fiction ==
Jeanna originated from Åland, and spent her life as a street seller (månglerska) of cakes in Stockholm, where she became a familiar figure. She came to be included in fiction during her lifetime.

She was a character in the comedy Donnerpamp by Carl Israel Hallman from 1782. She came to be mentioned as a minor character in many works of Swedish literature during the 19th century. A song about her runs:

Bakelse-Jeanna
Swedish song	Prose translation
Känner du Bakelse-Jeanna? Ja, nog känner ja’na Och har känt’na i många år!	Do you know Pastry-Jeanna? Yes, sure I've known her And have known her for many years!
Hon går på Stockholms gator, Säljer pepparkakor, Tar för stycket så mycket hon får.	She walks on Stockholm's streets, Sells gingerbread, For as much as she can get for each piece.

The name "Bakelse-Jeanna" was long used in Stockholm as a name for female pastry street vendors.

== See also ==
- Gumman Strömberg
- Augusta Dorothea Eklund
