= Gumman Strömberg =

Swedish fishmonger (1830–1894)

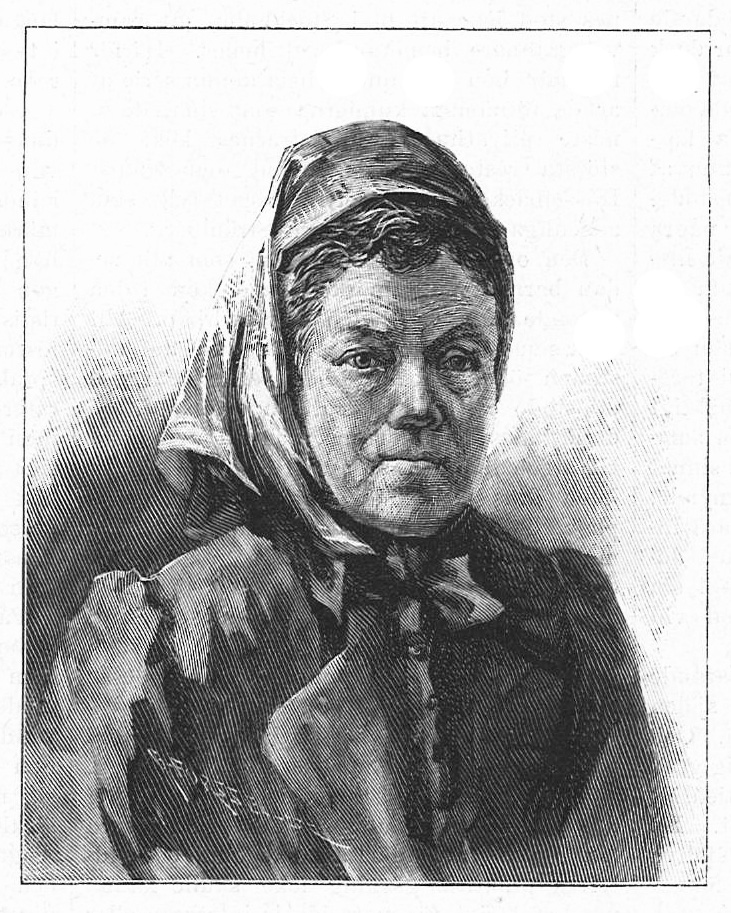
Johanna Strömberg Portrait

Johanna Strömberg née Malmberg (1830–1894), was a Swedish fishmonger. She worked in the Stockholm fish market from 1854 until 1894, and became a well-known figure in contemporary Stockholm, known as Gumman Strömberg (Old woman Strömberg). She was a successful entrepreneur in her trade with customers among the embassies and finest restaurants. She kept an open house for the poor and the capital's bohemian world, helping several artists.

== Life ==
Johanna Strömberg was born to a poor worker in Tierp. At the age of fifteen, she became a maid to a fish merchant in Stockholm. She married Karl Berg, the son of her employer, and learned the fish trade. Widowed soon after marriage, she remarried Johan Strömberg (d. 1890), who became her business partner and assistant. From circa 1854, Johanna Strömberg traded in fish from her stand on the street, being a member of the well-known månglare, that is to say, the certificated female traders with permission to hold street stands in the capital. She became a successful trader and delivered fish to the upper classes, the finest restaurants, and the homes of government ministers and ambassadors. She was eventually able to move her stand indoors to Hötorgshallen in 1879 and had by that time both male and female assistants.

She was a well-known contemporary Stockholm profile and known for the quality of her goods and for: "her never-ending honesty, her business competence, and her vigorous, original character". She held an open house for the artistic world of the capital and the poor. She was the mother of Johan Strömberg (1856–1914), an actor at the Royal Dramatic Theater; and the sister of the artists Josef Malmberg, whose education she financed, and the architect Karl Malmberg. She also financed her brother-in-law, sculptor Oskar Berg.

She died from appendicitis.

== See also ==
- Bakelse-Jeanna
- Augusta Dorothea Eklund
