= Feminism in the United States =

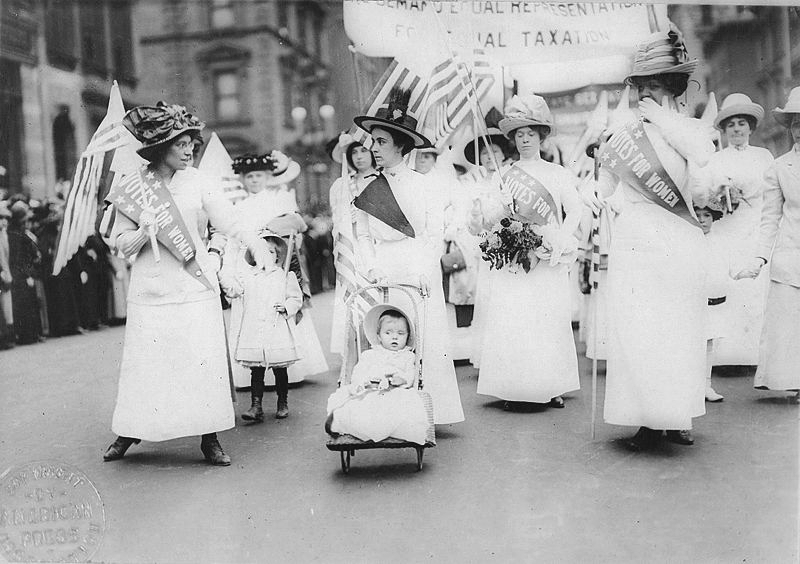
Women's suffrage parade in New York City, May 6, 1912

Feminism is aimed at defining, establishing, and defending a state of equal political, economic, cultural, and social rights for women. It has had a massive influence on American politics. Feminism in the United States is often divided chronologically into first-wave, second-wave, third-wave, and fourth-wave feminism.

As of 2025, the United States is ranked 42nd in the world on gender equality, according to the Global Gender Gap Report published by the World Economic Forum.

== Timeline ==
=== First-wave feminism ===
The first wave of feminism in the United States began with the Seneca Falls Convention, the first women's rights convention, held at the Wesleyan Chapel in Seneca Falls, New York, on July 19 and 20, 1848.

The Seneca Falls Convention was inspired by the experiences of Elizabeth Cady Stanton and Lucretia Mott at the World Anti-Slavery Convention in London in 1840. The conference refused to seat Mott and other women delegates from America because of their gender. Stanton, the young bride of an antislavery agent, and Mott, a Quaker preacher and veteran of reform, talked of calling a convention to address the condition and treatment of women.

An estimated three hundred people attended the convention, including notables Lucretia Mott and Frederick Douglass. At the conclusion, 68 women and 32 men signed the Declaration of Sentiments, which was written by Elizabeth Cady Stanton and the M'Clintock family.

The Declaration of Sentiments was written in the style and format of the Declaration of Independence. For example, the Declaration of Sentiments stated, "We hold these truths to be self evident, that all men and women are created equal and endowed by their creator with certain inalienable rights." The Declaration further stated, "The history of mankind is a history of repeated injuries and usurpation on the part of man towards woman."

The declaration went on to specify female grievances in regard to the laws denying married women ownership of wages, money, and property. Women were required to turn these things over to their husbands; the laws requiring this in effect throughout America were called coverture laws. A women's lack of access to education and professional careers, and the low status accorded to women in most churches was also addressed. Furthermore, the Declaration declared that women should have the right to vote.

Some of the participants at the Seneca Falls Convention organized the Rochester Women's Rights Convention two weeks later on August 2 in Rochester, New York. It was followed by other state and local conventions in Ohio, Pennsylvania, and New York. The first National Woman's Rights Convention was held in Worcester, Massachusetts in 1850. Women's rights conventions were then held regularly from 1850 until the start of the Civil War.

The American women's suffrage movement began with the 1848 Seneca Falls Convention; many of the activists became politically aware during the abolitionist movement. The movement reorganized after the Civil War, gaining experienced campaigners, many of whom had worked for prohibition in the Women's Christian Temperance Union. By the end of the 19th century only a few western states had granted women full voting rights, though women had made other significant legal victories, gaining rights in areas such as property and child custody.

In 1866, Elizabeth Cady Stanton and Susan B. Anthony formed the American Equal Rights Association, an organization for white and black women and men dedicated to the goal of suffrage for all. In 1868 the Fourteenth Amendment was passed, this was the first Amendment to ever specify the voting population as "male". In 1869 the women's rights movement split into two factions as a result of disagreements over the Fourteenth and soon-to-be-passed Fifteenth Amendments, with the two factions not reuniting until 1890. Elizabeth Cady Stanton and Susan B. Anthony formed the more radical, New York-based National Woman Suffrage Association (NWSA). Lucy Stone, Henry Blackwell, and Julia Ward Howe organized the more conservative American Woman Suffrage Association (AWSA), which was centered in Boston. In 1870 the Fifteenth Amendment enfranchised black men. NWSA refused to work for its ratification, arguing, instead, that it be "scrapped" in favor of a Sixteenth Amendment providing universal suffrage. Frederick Douglass broke with Stanton and Anthony over NWSA's position.

In 1869 Wyoming became the first territory or state in America to grant women suffrage. In 1870 Louisa Ann Swain became the first woman in the United States to vote in a general election. She cast her ballot on September 6, 1870, in Laramie, Wyoming.

From 1870 to 1875 several women, including Virginia Louisa Minor, Victoria Woodhull, and Myra Bradwell, attempted to use the Fourteenth Amendment in the courts to secure the vote (Minor and Woodhull) or the right to practice law (Bradwell), and they were all unsuccessful. In 1872 Susan B. Anthony was arrested and brought to trial in Rochester, New York, for attempting to vote for Ulysses S. Grant in the presidential election; she was convicted and fined $100 and the costs of her prosecution but refused to pay. At the same time, Sojourner Truth appeared at a polling booth in Battle Creek, Michigan, demanding a ballot; she was turned away. Also in 1872, Victoria Woodhull became the first woman to run for president, although she could not vote and only received a few votes, losing to Ulysses S. Grant. She was nominated to run by the Equal Rights Party, and advocated the 8-hour work day, graduated income tax, social welfare programs, and profit sharing, among other positions. In 1874 the Woman's Christian Temperance Union (WCTU) was founded by Annie Wittenmyer to work for the prohibition of alcohol; with Frances Willard at its head (starting in 1876), the WCTU also became an important force in the fight for women's suffrage. In 1878 a woman suffrage amendment was first introduced in the United States Congress, but it did not pass. In 1920, the Nineteenth Amendment was ratified, giving women the right to vote; the first wave of feminism is considered to have ended with that victory.

Margaret Higgins Sanger was one of the first American birth control activists. She was also a sex educator, writer, and nurse. She popularized the term "birth control", opened the first birth control clinic in the United States in 1916, and established organizations that evolved into the Planned Parenthood Federation of America.

On 4 June 1919, the United States Congress passed the 19th amendment to the U.S. constitution, granting women the right to vote. It was ratified on 18 August 1920, marking significant milestone in equal representation for women in the government.

==== Post-World War II feminism ====
World War II led to an increase in women in the workforce and pushed women into breadwinning jobs in traditionally male spheres. From 1940 to 1945, the number of women in the workforce went from 28% to 37%. The lack of men at home led to many women taking industrial jobs: by 1943, 1/3 of the workers in Boeing's Seattle factory were women. According to historian Jane Marcellus, women experienced a never before seen shift in public praise, as they were commended as being competent and intelligent. This is exemplified in media such as Rosie the Riveter's 'We Can Do It!' Slogan and the 1941 creation of Wonder Woman. This influx of women into the workforce and the media's positive portrayal of them led to many women seeing more routes to take than housewife.

However, this narrow definition of female empowerment was exclusive and not intended to be long-lasting. Women of color were the last to be considered for high paying industrial jobs. African American women were stuck doing domestic work for $3–$7 a week compared to white women earning up to $40 a week in factories. Furthermore, propaganda such as Rosie the Riveter presented a narrow view of working women: white, beautiful, and motivated by patriotism rather than economic necessity. For women of color and working-class women, World War II did not change their economic or societal position. Many of the women joining the workforce returned to the domestic sphere after the war. Workplace periodicals such as Bo'sn's Whistle framed women in sexual language and as oddities in the male industrial sphere.

Yet after World War II, the 1946 Congress of American Women's "Position of the American Woman Today" advocated for the rights of black and minority women. After serving together in factories, white feminism began to embrace intersectionality in the wake of World War II. A growing body of literature illustrates that there was no substantial long-run wage for women in this time. However, the incremental gains in income and societal status that women of color made during the 1940s had long-term effects on feminist thought. By 1950, the wage gap between white and African American females narrowed by 15%.

Opposition to domestic roles began to crop up in the late 1940s as more women were encouraged to become housewives. Edith Stern's 1949 essay, "Women are Household Slaves", emerged as an early preface to second-wave feminist thought. Stern argued that "as long as the institution of housewifery in its present form persists, both ideologically and practically it blocks any true liberation of women". She compared the position of women to that of sharecroppers and spoke out against the emotional and intellectual dissatisfaction of American women. Stern's essay was one of the first arguments that addressed female liberation in the context of the domestic sphere.

However, the 1950s did witness a return to traditional gender roles and values. The number of women in the workforce decreased from 37% to 32% by 1950 due to women giving up their jobs for men returning from war. The media also emphasized the domestic role of women rather than encouraging women to work as it had just a decade earlier. By 1956, 67% of American families had a television compared to just 6% in 1949. Characters such as June Cleaver in "Leave it to Beaver" glorified female characters as subservient housewives to a large, influenceable audience of American women.

However, according to Anna Lebovic, women's magazines such as Vogue in the 1950s set up the groundwork for second wave feminism by advocating for self-actualization and individuality of women. Similarly, 1951 surveys conducted on women who had previously worked at or did work in factories showed that women were expressing irritation with workplace discrimination. Specifically, 75% stated that they wanted to remain in their industry and expressed dissatisfaction that it was difficult to pursue careers such as "sales, academia, or journalism".

Despite the fact that the 1950s were characterized as a return to the domestic sphere for women, there are examples that the labor women conducted during World War II set the stage for the second wave feminism of the 1960s. College reunions in the 1950s, which inspired Betty Friedan's landmark "The Feminine Mystique" were hotbeds for middle-class women to vent about their boredom working at home and by doing so discover shared irritations at the "drudgery" of being a housewife. While the 1940s and 1950s did not entirely foster a new wave of feminism or a substantive amount of feminist literature, this time period did lay some foundations for future feminist thought.

=== Second-wave feminism ===
Second-wave feminism in the United States began in the early 1960s. Throughout most of the 60's and ending in 1970, second wave feminism commonly followed the motto, "the personal is political". In 1963 Betty Friedan, influenced by The Second Sex, wrote the bestselling book The Feminine Mystique in which she explicitly objected to the mainstream media image of women, stating that placing women at home limited their possibilities, and wasted talent and potential. The perfect nuclear family image depicted and strongly marketed at the time, she wrote, did not reflect happiness and was rather degrading for women. This book is widely credited with having begun second-wave feminism in the United States.

Also in 1963, freelance journalist Gloria Steinem gained widespread popularity among feminists after a diary she authored while working undercover as a Playboy Bunny waitress at the Playboy Club was published as a two-part feature in the May and June issues of Show. Steinem alleged the club was mistreating its waitresses in order to gain male customers and exploited the Playboy Bunnies as symbols of male chauvinism, noting that the club's manual instructed the Bunnies that "there are many pleasing ways they can employ to stimulate the club's liquor volume." By 1968, Steinem had become arguably the most influential figure in the movement, with support for legalized abortion and free day care becoming the two leading objectives for feminists.

The movement grew with legal victories such as the Equal Pay Act of 1963, Title VII of the Civil Rights Act of 1964 (which banned sex discrimination in employment), and the Griswold v. Connecticut Supreme Court ruling of 1965 (which legalized birth control for married couples). In 1966 Betty Friedan joined other women and men to found the National Organization for Women (NOW); Friedan would be named as the organization's first president. Among the most significant legal victories of the movement in the late 1960s after the formation of NOW in 1966 were a 1967 Executive Order extending full affirmative action rights to women, Eisenstadt v. Baird (1972), in which the Supreme Court ruled that unmarried people had the same right to birth control as married people, and the legalization of no-fault divorce (although not legalized in all states until 2010).

The movement picked up more victories in the 1970s. The Title X Family Planning Program, officially known as Public Law 91-572 or "Population Research and Voluntary Family Planning Programs" was enacted under President Richard Nixon in 1970 as part of the Public Health Service Act; it is the only federal grant program dedicated solely to providing individuals with comprehensive family planning and related preventive health services. The Supreme Court case Reed v. Reed (1971), was the case in which the Supreme Court for the first time applied the Equal Protection Clause of the 14th Amendment to strike down a law that discriminated against women. Also, while the Equal Pay Act of 1963 did not originally cover executives, administrators, outside salespeople, and professionals, the Education Amendments of 1972 amended it so that it does. Also in 1972, the Supreme Court case Eisenstadt v Baird legalized birth control for unmarried people. Also that year Title IX of the Education Amendments of 1972 outlawed sex discrimination in public schools and public colleges. In 1973 the Roe v Wade Supreme Court case legalized abortion. In 1974 the Equal Credit Opportunity Act criminalized sex discrimination by creditors against credit applicants. Also in 1974 sex was added as a protected class under the Fair Housing Act, thus illegalizing sex discrimination in housing. Also in 1974 the Women's Educational Equity Act was enacted. The criminalization of marital rape in the United States started in the mid-1970s and by 1993 marital rape became a crime in all 50 states, under at least one section of the sexual offense codes. In 1978 the Pregnancy Discrimination Act was enacted; it is a United States federal statute which amended Title VII of the Civil Rights Act of 1964 to "prohibit sex discrimination on the basis of pregnancy".

A major disappointment of the second-wave feminist movement in the United States was President Nixon's 1972 veto of the Comprehensive Child Development Bill of 1972, which would have provided a multibillion-dollar national day care system.

The feminist movement in the late 1970s, led by NOW, briefly attempted a program to help older divorced and widowed women. Many widows were ineligible for Social Security benefits, few divorcees actually received any alimony, and after a career as a housewife, few had skills to enter the labor force. The program, however, encountered sharp criticism from young activists who gave priority to poor minority women rather than the middle class. By 1980, NOW downplayed the program as it focused almost exclusively on the Equal Rights Amendment (ERA). Phyllis Schlafly, the conservative leader, moved into the vacuum. She denounced the feminists for abandoning older middle-class widows and divorcees in need, and warned that ERA would equalize the laws for the benefit of men, stripping protections that older women urgently needed.

The main disappointment of the second wave feminist movement in the United States was the failure to ratify the federal Equal Rights Amendment. It states, "Equality of rights under the law shall not be denied or abridged by the United States or by any state on account of sex." The deadline for ratification of the Equal Rights Amendment expired in 1982.

Although the United States signed the Convention on the Elimination of All Forms of Discrimination against Women in 1980, it has never been ratified.

Many historians view the second wave feminist era in America as ending in the early 1980s with the Feminist Sex Wars, a split within the movement over issues such as sexuality and pornography. These disputes ushered in the era of third-wave feminism in the early 1990s.

==== Commercial sex work ====
In San Francisco in 1973, Call Off Your Tired Old Ethics (COYOTE) was formed to be the first American sex workers' rights organization. Started by Margo St. James, a self-proclaimed feminist and sex worker, COYOTE worked to give sex workers basic occupational rights and sexual self-determination. That same year, the National Organization for Women (NOW) drafted a resolution in support of COYOTE, calling for the decriminalization of prostitution. After this, COYOTE and NOW worked together to fight to pass the Equal Rights Amendment (ERA), which ultimately did not pass.

In 1978, the first feminist conference on the pornography industry was held in San Francisco. The next year, more than 5,000 women marched in Times Square against pornography, cementing the anti-pornography feminist movement. Anti-pornography feminists viewed porn as the graphic and sexually explicit way that men subordinated and dehumanized women. They blamed pornography for much of the rape, prostitution, and assault present in the United States. In 1983, an anti-porn ordinance, written and proposed by Catharine MacKinnon and Andrea Dworkin, was drafted in the Minneapolis City Council. Ultimately, the ordinance was defeated by a group of people who felt that the way anti-pornography feminists painted the effects of pornography was inherently sexist and made women, especially sex workers, seem as though they were incapable of giving consent. The backlash from the anti-porn movement resulted in a faction of feminists who called themselves "fuck me feminists". These were women who empowered themselves by reclaiming the sexual objectification and exploitation that had always been used against them. While this seems like an inherently pro-sex work view to have, many "fuck me feminists" viewed sex workers as being victims or being oppressed; so, they were unable to truly choose what happened to their bodies.

By 1985, support for prostitution and sex workers in the United States, especially by the feminists movement, hit a major decline. This was, in part, because of the divided views on the subject held by members of the feminist movement. The dominant point of view, one held by the U.S. Prostitutes Collective and Women Hurt in Systems of Prostitution Engaged in Revolt (WHISPER), supported decriminalization as an interim measure, but ultimately believe in the abolition of prostitution.

===== Different feminist views on sex work =====
There are many different factions within the feminist movement, and each faction took its own stance on the issue of sex work.

Marxist feminists believe that prostitution is a result of capitalism, and therefore, sex workers are exploited by the ruling class, whether that is the pimp or the patriarchy. Marxist feminists believe that prostitutes symbolize the value of women in society, and how a woman's worth is measured in her social, sexual, and economic subordination. Marxist feminists fall into the abolition faction of feminists, and they view abolition of prostitution as an integral pillar to the eventual overthrowing of the patriarchy.

The domination theory feminists believe the root of oppression of women rests in sexuality, and sexuality is a thing to be stolen, sold, bought, bartered, or exchanged by men. Dominant theory feminists view prostitution not as an industry, but, rather, as a state in which all women find themselves. Because they view all sexual intercourse as violent and victimizing to women, dominant theory feminists believe in the abolition of sex work.

Liberal feminists tend to be split between the argument of whether all sex work is degrading to women, and the argument that sex work is work, and should be treated as such. Either way, liberal feminists believe in the legalization of sex work, as criminalization prohibits women's ability to control their own bodies.

Radical sexual-pluralist theory feminists reject the binaries through which other feminists view the world. They do not view the world as having goods and bads, or normal and deviants, as it creates binaries where one form of thinking is praised, and another is condemned. When it comes to sex work, radical sexual-pluralist theory feminists do not have a specific opinion on legalization. Instead, they believe sex workers should speak out against their own marginalization created by the binary, and that feminists should take sex workers opinions and experiences into account when forming their own.

Because of the many divisions within the feminist movement on the topic of sex work, big organizations like NOW preferred to focus on more universal women's rights issues such as abortion. While still controversial, reproductive rights are much less nuanced and leave feminists divided into just two or so divisions, instead of many. Additionally, reproductive rights made an impact on every single woman in this country, instead of one group of women, which made it more appealing for large organizations.

===== Sex workers and feminist safe spaces =====
Feminists were not always welcoming to sex workers, even feminists who supported the decriminalization or legalization of sex work. They created safe spaces for women, especially lesbian women, where feminists could talk and be themselves. The ability to be comfortable with their bodies and sexualities was extremely important in these safe spaces, and women often danced together, sometimes taking their tops off as an expression of comfort with their femininity. Despite the purpose of these places being safe spaces for women, it was made very clear that these places were not meant to be lewd, meaning somewhere men could pick up women to have sex, paid or not. Because of the stigma associated with sex workers, especially with multiple sex workers frequenting the same place, sex workers were not generally accepted in these feminist safe spaces as the women felt it infringed on their comfort. Though never technically banned, sex workers felt isolated within these spaces and tended to avoid them.

=== Third-wave feminism ===
Third-wave feminism in the United States began in the early 1990s. In 1991, Anita Hill accused Clarence Thomas, a man nominated to the United States Supreme Court, of sexual harassment. Thomas denied the accusations and, after extensive debate, the United States Senate voted 52–48 in favor of Thomas. In 1992, in response to the Anita Hill sexual harassment case, American feminist Rebecca Walker published an article in Ms. magazine entitled "Becoming the Third Wave" in which she stated, "I am not a post-feminism feminist. I am the third-wave," which coined the term "third wave". Also in 1992, Third Wave Direct Action Corporation was founded by Walker and American feminist Shannon Liss (now Shannon Liss-Riordan) as a multiracial, multicultural, multi-issue organization to support young activists. The organization's initial mission was to fill a void in young women's leadership and to mobilize young people to become more involved socially and politically in their communities.

In the early 1990s, the riot grrrl movement began in Olympia, Washington and Washington, D.C.; it sought to give women the power to control their voices and artistic expressions. However, riot grrrl's emphasis on universal female identity and separatism often appears more closely allied with second-wave feminism than with the third wave. Third-wave feminists sought to question, reclaim, and redefine the ideas, words, and media that have transmitted ideas about gender, gender roles, womanhood, beauty, and sexuality, among other things. Third-wave feminism saw many new feminist icons such as Madonna, Queen Latifah, Angelina Jolie, Emma Watson, Beyoncé, and Lady Gaga, as well as fictional characters such as Buffy and Mulan. Third-wave feminists also used the Internet and other modern technology to enhance their movement, which allowed for information and organization to reach a larger audience. This larger audience also expanded to many male celebrities such as Aziz Ansari and Leonardo DiCaprio.

The increasing ease of publishing on the Internet meant that e-zines (electronic magazines) and blogs became ubiquitous. Many serious independent writers, not to mention organizations, found that the Internet offered a forum for the exchange of information and the publication of essays and videos that made their point to a potentially huge audience. The Internet radically democratized the content of the feminist movement with respect to participants, aesthetics, and issues.

— Laura Brunell, 2008 Britannica Book of the Year

Through the 1980s and 1990s, this trend continued as musicologists like Susan McClary and Marcia Citron began to consider the cultural reasons for the marginalizing of women from the received body of work. Concepts such as music as gendered discourse; professionalism; reception of women's music; examination of the sites of music production; relative wealth and education of women; popular music studies in relation to women's identity; patriarchal ideas in music analysis; and notions of gender and difference are among the themes examined during this time. During the third wave of feminism, the issue of transgender folk and their role in movement became a prominent topic of discussion among many feminists when third-wave feminists started to question the binary, biological nature of gender and sex. TERF, which stands for trans-exclusionary radical feminism became a term directed at feminists who viewed trans women as a threat to other women in the movement.

=== Fourth-wave feminism ===
Fourth-wave feminism refers to a resurgence of interest in feminism that began around 2012 and is associated with the use of social media. According to feminist scholar Prudence Chamberlain, the focus of the fourth wave is justice for women and opposition to sexual harassment and violence against women. Its essence, she writes, is "incredulity that certain attitudes can still exist".

Fourth-wave feminism is "defined by technology" according to Kira Cochrane, and it is characterized particularly by the use of Facebook, Twitter, Instagram, YouTube, Tumblr, and blogs such as Feministing to challenge misogyny and further gender equality. Fourth-wave feminism can be further defined by its focus on intersectionality and broadening views on gender-identity.

Issues that fourth-wave feminists focus on include street and workplace harassment, campus sexual assault and rape culture. Scandals involving the harassment, abuse, and murder of women and girls have galvanized the movement. In the United States, these have included the Bill Cosby sexual assault cases, the 2014 Isla Vista killings, and the 2017 Harvey Weinstein allegations, which kickstarted the American Me Too movement and led to similar movements worldwide.

Examples of fourth-wave feminist campaigns in the United States include Mattress Performance, The Time's Up Now movement, and 10 Hours of Walking in NYC as a Woman.

== Criticism ==
=== Racism in feminism ===
Pauline Terrelonge Stone writes in Feminist Consciousness and Black Women, “Racism is so ingrained in American culture, and so entrenched among white women, that black females have been reluctant to admit that anything affecting the white female could also affect them.”

Critics of mainstream feminist discourse point to the white-washed historical narrative that omits and/or minimizes the roles played by women of color within and without the feminist movement, as well as the differing obstacles faced by women of color. Ida Bell Wells-Barnett, a key figure in the early feminist movement, faced opposition from white feminist leaders such as Rebecca Latimer Felton and Frances Willard, who saw the feminist movement as an Anglo Saxon pursuit and built their rhetoric on white supremacy: "The Anglo-Saxon race," Willard wrote, "will never submit to be dominated by the Negro so long as his altitude reaches no higher than the personal liberty of the saloon."

By the 1970s and 1980s, African-American women had developed a social consciousness by publicly voicing dissatisfaction with black women's representation in feminist discourse. In 1981, feminist and essayist Audre Lorde stated: "What woman here is so enamored of her own oppression that she cannot see her heel print upon another woman's face? What woman's terms of oppression have become precious and necessary to her as a ticket into the fold of the righteous, away from the cold winds of self-scrutiny? ... We welcome all women who can meet us, face to face, beyond objectification and beyond guilt." In 1989, Black scholar Kimberlé Crenshaw coined the term intersectionality in her essay "Demarginalizing the Intersection of Race and Sex: A Black Feminist Critique of Antidiscrimination Doctrine, Feminist Theory and Antiracist Politics." Crenshaw argued that discrimination against Black women is a combination of racism and sexism and is thus difficult to fit into one category or the other. She stated, "The goal of this activity should be to facilitate the inclusion of marginalized groups for whom it can be said: "When they enter, we all enter."

== See also ==
- Abortion in the United States
- Birth control movement in the United States
- Civil Rights Act of 1964
- Feminism of Madonna
- Feminist art movement in the United States
- Feminist Majority Foundation
- Feminist movements and ideologies
- Betty Friedan
- Gender equality
- Go Topless Day
- Goddess movement
- Homeless women in the United States
- List of women's rights conventions in the United States
- Married Women's Property Acts in the United States
- Nevertheless, she persisted
- Radical Women
- Reproductive rights
- Roe v. Wade
- Margaret Sanger
- Sex-positive feminism
- Sexism
- Gloria Steinem
- Timeline of feminism in the United States
- Violence Against Women Act
- Woman's club movement in the United States
- Women in the United States Prohibition movement
- Women's education in the United States
- Women's Equality Day
- Women's health movement in the United States
- Women's suffrage in the United States
