= Fabriks och Handtwerksordning =

Swedish business law, introduced 1846

Fabriks och Handtwerksordning ('Factory and Handicrafts Regulation') was a business law reform introduced in Sweden 22 December 1846. It is foremost remembered as the reform that abolished the system of the guilds in Sweden.

The law transformed the guilds to handicrafts associations with the task to approve the qualifications of those applying to the authorities for permission to practice a certain profession within trade and handicrafts. Male applicants were still required to study under a master, pass the test and apply for membership of the guild. Female applicants of legal majority, meaning widows, divorced women and unmarried women who had been legally declared of legal majority by court petition, as well as married women with permission from their husbands, were allowed to apply for any profession within trade and handicrafts without having to become a guild member. The former restriction of the guilds from being active within more than one profession were lifted.

It was introduced in parallel with the Handelsordningen. The reform abolished the 1720 års skråordning, and was followed and completed by the 1864 års näringsförordning.
