= Handelsordningen =

Handelsordningen ('Trade Regulation') was a business law reform introduced in Sweden 22 December 1846.

The reform abolished the legal differences between retail business and wholesaling business, transformed the trade guilds to trade associations, and granted all men over the age of 21 the right to apply for a trade permit as long as they mastered the four mathematics operations and bookkeeping. Women were given the same right as long as they were of legal majority (widows, divorced women, or unmarried women who had themselves declared of legal majority by court petition) or were given permission by their husband and guardian.

It was introduced in parallel with the Fabriks och Handtwerksordning. The reform abolished the 1720 års skråordning, and was followed and completed by the 1864 års näringsförordning.
