= Guild Regulation of 1720 =

1720 års skråordning ('Guild Regulation of 1720') was a law reform introduced in Sweden in 1720. It replaced the 1669 års allmänna skråordning ('General Guild Regulation of 1669') and, with additional modifications, regulated the guild system and business life in Sweden until the Fabriks och Handtwerksordning and Handelsordningen of 1846.

== Regulation of 1720 ==
The Guild Regulation of 1720 replaced the previous Guild Regulation of 1669, which had been the first national Guild Regulation in Sweden. There had been many suggestions to abolish the guild system, which called for a reform.

The reformed Guild Regulation essentially kept the already established customary system with masters and apprentices. The reform consisted in the codification of customary regulations already in common use, as well as a simplification of the system, in order to make a guild memberships more easily attainable.

The most radical reform was that concerning women's rights within the guild system. Women were already de facto active as guild members, but the Guild Regulation of 1720 explicitly secured women the right to work within the guild professions, both as apprentices and assistants in the workshop of a master, or as masters of their own workshop. Women were further more guaranteed the right to buy a permit from the city magistrates to manage a business outside of the guilds as kontingentborgare. The practice of these reforms were somewhat different. The permit for women to manage workshops themselves were often interpreted by the authorities as merely a permit for a woman to be active in a certain guild profession personally; that is, she was seldom allowed to have apprentices. It is however confirmed that there were many women professionally active as apprentices in male masters shops in 18th-century Stockholm with support of this law.

The Civil Code of 1734, in which married women were placed under the guardianship of their husbands, and unmarried women under the guardianship of their closest male relative, complicated their possibility to use the rights given them in the Guild Regulation of 1720, as only widowed and divorced women were of legal majority. The procedure for unmarried women wishing to engage in business, were to have themselves declared of legal majority by royal petition, which became a common procedure for unmarried business women, but married women did not have this right, and the Civil Code therefore in fact prevented married women from using the rights afforded to women in the Guild Regulation. However, the city magistrates and the crown often granted special dispensation to women to engage in business and various professions, despite opposition from the guilds, if the woman applicant could prove that she needed to support herself; these special permits were granted also to married women whose husbands could not support them, despite married women being legal minors, and the dispensation were granted with reference to this law.

== Amendments of 1810 ==
The Guild Regulation of 1720 was in place until 1846, but adjusted by several amendments. In the Riksdag of 1809-10, a number of reforms in the legal privileges of the four official classes were introduced prompted by the Coup of 1809, and this included the privileges of the burgher class, represented by the guild system.

The reform of 1810 stated that any citizen had the right to practice a profession outside of the guild provided that they fulfilled their professional obligations. The Guilds interpreted obligations to be the traditional guild requirements, while the city magistrates started to issue permits to male citizens outside the guilds (women already had that opportunity since before): the conflicts was solved in 1820, when the monarch stated that the Guild Regulation of 1720 was still in use.

The right of the Guilds to persecute professionals active outside of the Guilds was also abolished. This was a right which had previously often been used by the Guilds to persecute those given permits and special dispensations to be active in a profession outside of the Guilds by the city magistrates and the crown, and the right had since 1720 been a cause of conflict between the Guilds and the other authorities. With this ban, the Guilds were finally explicitly forced to respect permits and special dispensations given by other authorities that the Guilds to be active within Guild professions. However, this ban was never to be respected by the Guilds, and the court cases between the Guilds and the city authorities regarding people with special permits and dispensations continued, even after the monarch tried to enforce the law in 1820.

All unmarried or widowed women applicants (as married women were under guardianship) were given permission to engage in all professions, trades and handicrafts socially acceptable for them by custom without having to fulfill any of the educational requirements which was necessary for a male applicant when applying for a permit. The reason stated was that a certain number of professions were already widely socially accepted for women, such as that of seamstress, glove maker, knitting socks, button- and ribbon maker, baker and that of selling ornaments; and that it would benefit women who was forced to support themselves that these profession were made more easily attainable.

The profession of seamstress were regarded as so suitable for a woman that city magistrates regularly gave women permits to be active outside of the Guilds despite opposition from the Guild of Taylors, so much so that the Taylor's Guild were undermined to extinction; in the 1770s, they were 175 seamstresses in Stockholm, and in 1790, only 114 Guild taylors with permit to sew women's clothes remained. The Riksdag of 1809 suggested that the Taylor's Guild be abolished and the taylor profession be reserved for women: though this did not happen, the dispensations given to seamstresses to be active outside of the taylor's guild, which had grown since the mid 18th-century, became so many by the early 19th-century that the Taylor's Guild de facto left the manufacture of women's clothes to seamstresses.

== Amendments of 1819-1845 ==
The period of 1819, until the final abolition of the guild system by the Fabriks och Handtwerksordning and Handelsordningen of 1846, was filled of a number of amendments undermining the guild system.

In 1819, the owner of gardens in Stockholm were allowed to sell their fruits and vegetables in the city on the same terms as the members of the Garden master's Guild. Women were also explicitly awarded a number of professional rights, all with reference to their need to support themselves: in 1821, women were given the right to manufacture cut glass; in 1832 the right to make metal objects; and the years up until 1845 the right to make and sell, among others, Lacquer, pomade, perfume, soap, balsam, food, syrup, chocolate, lemonade. In 1835, women were given the right to become bakers without having to apply for a dispensation.

By 1846, the amendments to the Guild Regulation of 1720 and the demands to abolish the Guild system altogether became so urgent that it was finally replaced by the Fabriks och Handtwerksordning and Handelsordningen of 1846.
