= Decree of Extended Freedom of Trade (Sweden) =

Förordningen för utvidgad näringsfrihet ('Decree of Extended Freedom of Trade'), also known as 1864 års näringsförordning ('Trade Decree of 1864'), was a Swedish law reform introduced 18 Jun 1864. It was law until 1968.

The reform continued the reform of Swedish commercial life, initiated by the Fabriks och Handtwerksordning and Handelsordningen of 1846, by introducing complete freedom of economy. It abolished all requirements and privileges of the guilds and removed all restrictions of trade and handicrafts professions in the cities as well as the country side and granted the right to start a business to all citizens of legal majority, or those with permission from their guardian, regardless of gender.
