= Arturo & Kiwi =

- Le ricette di Arturo e Kiwi
- Created by: Andrea Zingoni
- Country of origin: Italy
- Original language: Italian
- No. of seasons: 5
- No. of episodes: 78

Production
- Running time: 5 minutes (seasons 1–4), 6 minutes (season 5)

Original release
- Release: 7 May 2007 – 2025

Arturo & Kiwi (Le ricette di Arturo e Kiwi) is an Italian animated television series, characterized in a comic way (but with educational value), which illustrates in four minutes various recipes, typical of Italian regional cuisine.

== History ==
=== Production ===
Arturo & Kiwi was created and developed in 2006 by Andrea Zingoni, one of the founders of Giovanotti Mondani Meccanici. The animation was produced by the Cartobaleno studio. In the two-year period 2006–2007 two series composed of 13 episodes each, featuring Italian recipes were realized. In 2008 a third series of 13 episodes entitled Arturo & Kiwi – Cooking for puppies with international recipes was produced, and two years later a fourth 13-episodes series under the same title but with both Italian and international recipes. At the end of 2025, a 5th season of Arturo & Kiwi was announced and then later released.

The first series was aired initially starting on May 7, 2007, from Monday to Friday within the television program for kids Trebisonda, in the afternoon time slot, on Rai 3, to then move from the 12th of the same month exclusively to Saturday and Sunday in the morning, time slot maintained for the transmission of the remaining episodes of the first season and for all those of the second. Subsequently, the program was always hosted on Rai 3, on Sunday morning, inside È domenica papà, where the third and fourth series were also aired Occasionally it also aired in La prova del cuoco by Rai 1

In 2007 the series won the High Quality Award for Childhood Il Grillo while in 2010 an iPad application was launched where the two protagonists explained, always in a humorous way, how to use utensils and kitchen appliances, along with some table manners

== Origin ==
The series is an evolution of some cartoons made some years before by Zingoni and Held and aired on the My-Tv internet portal. The series was called La Cucina Ginese, since in the first two episodes of the total six of the series it was Gino il pollo, the draftsman's most famous creature to act as assistant to the chef Q-Gino, who was none other than the cock of the logo of the Riso Gallo In fact, the series was a sort of advertising spot for the various types of cereals produced by the company. In this series the Kiwi makes his first debut, first as an "ingredient" found by Gino and then, starting from the third episode, as a cooking assistant During the episodes of La Cucina Ginese some jokes and tormentos are recognizable that today characterize the duet Arturo and Kiwi. Thus, the series can be considered a link between the two works of Zingoni. The six episodes were available online before on the official website and subsequently on the official YouTube channel of Riso Gallo since December 2013

== Characters ==
The series has two characters, in the style of the comic duet. Often, the kitchen changes some of the furnishing details to adapt to the origin city or nation of the presented dish. In the presentation of the recipes a meter is adopted to define the cooking difficulty called "Grado Kiwi" (Kiwi Grade) with values starting from 1 (very easy) to 7 (challenging).

=== Arturo ===
Arturo, the cook, is a surly (but basically good-natured) Neapolitan Mastiff who, as he himself says, has left his heart in Naples. He is a very refined and prepared "chef" and his role is to introduce and illustrate the recipes. In his squabbles with Kiwi he is in the habit of repeating the catchphrase "Mammina mia give me the strength!". Among the various aprons worn, he often wears one with the words "Italians do it better" (Madonna's famous slogan) and sometimes one with "we are the champions" (with the background of the Italian tricolor). When introducing a recipe in which the eggs are used, in the first two seasons it was ensured that they were not of the Kiwi. In some episodes he makes it clear that he is a pacifist and that he hates weapons. Arturo's voice is that of Andrea Zingoni.

=== Kiwi ===
Kiwi, the assistant, is a distorted New Zealand kiwi. He has the role of preparing the recipes because he is a so-called "good fork" in the kitchen. He has a passion for fine wines and spirits, and every time he tries to drink the alcohol he is immediately scolded by Arturo. His entrances on the stage are always "curtain-raisers", in which he presents himself with curious costumes, which he then removes while singing earworms such as "Kiwi, kiwi allelujah!" and (often) gets smacked with a pan by Arturo. His entry into the scene, the linguistic misunderstandings with Arturo on some culinary terms, and the tone of voice with the appearance of a chick, make him the "sidekick" of the comedy duet. The character also talks about replacing the vowels at the end of the word with the "u" and is shown as a Latin lover, often on the phone with his conquests, but it's also known that he is married with children ("tengu figli, cane, gattu... and picciuncina "). Although skilled in the kitchen, when he is dealing with fire he frequently gets burned and then scolded by Arturo who uses his catchphrase question "How do you suffer?" to which Kiwi responds "In silence.". Kiwi's voice is that of Andrea Zingoni.

=== Artificial cob ===
A living cob that acts like a zombie appears only in the initials and appears to be the only antagonist.

== Episodes ==
The Italian episode names are often homonyms or puns of the name of the Italian recipe presented in the episode.

=== Season 1 ===
Episode number	Title	Type of dish	Original air date
1	Panzanella	Bread salad	2007
2	Trenette al pesto	Trenette pasta with pesto sauce	2007
3	Zabaione con lingue di gatto	Custard dessert with sweet cookies/biscuits	7 May 2007
4	Crostini di fegatini	Croutons with liver pâté	8 May 2007
5	Cacciucco	Seafood stew	10 May 2007
6	Costolette alla milanese	Milanese-style breaded veal cutlets	9 May 2007
7	Pollo alla cacciatora	Chicken cacciatore	2007
8	Polpettone	Italian meatloaf	11 May 2007
9	Sarde in tortiera	Sardine and potato casserole	2007
10	Saltimbocca alla romana	Roman-style saltimbocca	2007
11	Tagliatelle al ragù	Tagliatelle with meat sauce	2007
12	Tiramisù	Tiramisù	2007
13	Focaccia dolce di ricotta	Sweet focaccia with ricotta cheese	2007

=== Season 2 ===
Episode number	Title	Type of dish	Original air date
1	Spaghetti alla carbonara	Spaghetti carbonara	2007
2	Penne all'arrabbiata	Penne pasta with arrabbiata sauce	2007
3	Spaghetti con le vongole	Spaghetti with clams	2007
4	Orecchiette con polpettine al sugo	Orecchiette pasta with meatballs in a tomato sauce	2007
5	Gnocchi di patate al burro e salvia	Gnocchi with butter and sage	2007
6	Salsicce e fagioli all'uccelletto	Sausages and bean sauce	2007
7	Sarde a beccafico	Sardines with breadcrumb stuffing	2007
8	Sauté di cozze e vongole	Sauteed mussels and clams	2007
9	Scaloppine al marsala	Meat slices with Marsala wine sauce	2007
10	Carpaccio di manzo	Beef carpaccio	2007
11	Torta di noci al cioccolato	Chocolate and walnut cake	2007
12	Panna cotta	Panna cotta	2007
13	Pesche all'amaretto	Peaches with amaretto cookie filling	2007

=== Season 3 ===
Episode number	Title	Type of dish	Original air date
1	Milkshake alla fragola	Strawberry milkshake	2008
2	Baby kebab di carne macinata	Ground meat kebab	2008
3	Fantasmini di Halloween	Halloween ghost-shaped meringue cookies	2008
4	Pretzel salati	Pretzels	2008
5	Crepes al cioccolato	Crêpes with chocolate	2008
6	Banana split	Banana split	2008
7	Torta di San Valentino	Valentine's Day cake	2008
8	Pollo al limone alla cinese	Chinese-style lemon chicken	2008
9	Tropical beach cocktail con spiedini di frutta	Fruit cocktail	2008
10	Baby burritos	Small burritos	2008
11	Pancakes con sciroppo d'acero	Pancakes with maple syrup	2008
12	Tempura di calamari e verdure	Squid and vegetable tempura	2008
13	Quiche lorraine	Quiche lorraine	2008

=== Season 4 ===
Episode number	Title	Type of dish	Original air date
1	Brigadeiros	Brigadeiro	2010
2	Granita al limone alla siciliana	Lemon granita	2010
3	Crema catalana	Crema catalana	2010
4	Polpette di carne alla Arturo	Arturo's meatball recipe	2010
5	Marmellata di kiwi	Kiwifruit marmalade	2010
6	Pizza margherita	Pizza Margherita	2010
7	Tortilla de patatas	Spanish omelette	2010
8	Lassi di mango	Mango lassi	2010
9	Riso alla cantonese con gamberetti	Yangzhou fried rice	2010
10	Croque monsieur	Croque monsieur	2010
11	Spaghetti al pomodoro crudo	Spaghetti with uncooked tomato sauce	2010
12	Muffin al cioccolato	Chocolate muffin	2010
13	Pojarski al salmone	Pozharsky cutlet made with salmon	2010

=== Season 5 ===
Episode number	Title	Type of dish	Original air date
1	Spaghetti aglio, olio e peperoncino	Spaghetti with garlic, oil and red pepper flakes	2025
2	Zeppole di San Giuseppe	Saint Joseph's Day fried doughnuts	2025
3	Pasta e fagioli	Pasta and beans	2025
4	Mozzarella in carrozza	Carrozza sandwich	2025
5	Panettone Marietta	Panettone	2025
6	Pesce spada alla siciliana	Sicilian-style swordfish	2025
7	Bucatini all'amatriciana	Bucatini pasta with amatriciana sauce	2025
8	Cantuccini di Prato	Prato biscotti	2025
9	Parmigiana di melanzane	Eggplant parmesan	2025
10	Focaccia Genovese	Genoese focaccia	2025
11	Gelato fiordilatte	Plain gelato	2025
12	Risotto alla milanese	Milanese-style risotto (with saffron)	2025
13	Fritto misto di mare	Mixed fried seafood	2025
14	Farinata di ceci	Porridge made from chickpeas	2025
15	Tonnarelli cacio e pepe	Tonnarelli pasta with cheese and pepper	2025
16	Fegato alla veneziana	Venetian-style liver (with onions)	2025
17	Pappa al pomodoro	Tomato soup	2025
18	Fettuccine all'Alfredo	Fettuccine Alfredo	2025
19	Ravioli ricotta e spinaci	Ravioli filled with spinach and ricotta	2025
20	Taralli pugliesi	Apulian taralli	2025
21	Vitello tonnato	Veal slices with tuna sauce	2025
22	Polenta con brasato	Polenta with braised meat	2025
23	Castagnaccio	Chestnut cake	2025
24	Piadina romagnola	Romagna-style flatbread	2025
25	Penne alla 'nduja	Penne pasta with spicy pork spread	2025
26	Cannolo siciliano	Sicilian cannoli	2025

== See also ==
- List of Italian television series
