= Toschi =

Toschi may refer to:

- Plural form of Tosco, synonym of Toscano, meaning "from Tuscany"
- Dave Toschi (1931–2018), former inspector in the San Francisco Police Department
- Giulio Carlo de' Toschi di Fagnano (1682–1766), marquis de Toschi, Italian mathematician
- Paolo Toschi (1788–1854), Italian draughtsman and engraver
- Pier Francesco d'Jacopo di Domenico Toschi (died 1567), Italian painter
- Domenico Toschi (1535–1620), Italian cardinal

== See also ==
- Etruscan (disambiguation)
- Tuscan (disambiguation)
- Tuscany (disambiguation)
