= Tasco =

Tasco may refer to:

- Tasco (company), American company which sells consumer telescopes
- Tasco, Boyacá, Colombian municipality
- Tasco, Kansas, unincorporated community in Sheridan County, Kansas, United States
- USS Tasco, United States Navy ship

== See also ==
- Tasca (surname)
- Tesco (disambiguation)
- Tosca (disambiguation)
- Tosco (disambiguation)
