= Tuscan cuisine =

Culinary traditions of Tuscany, Italy

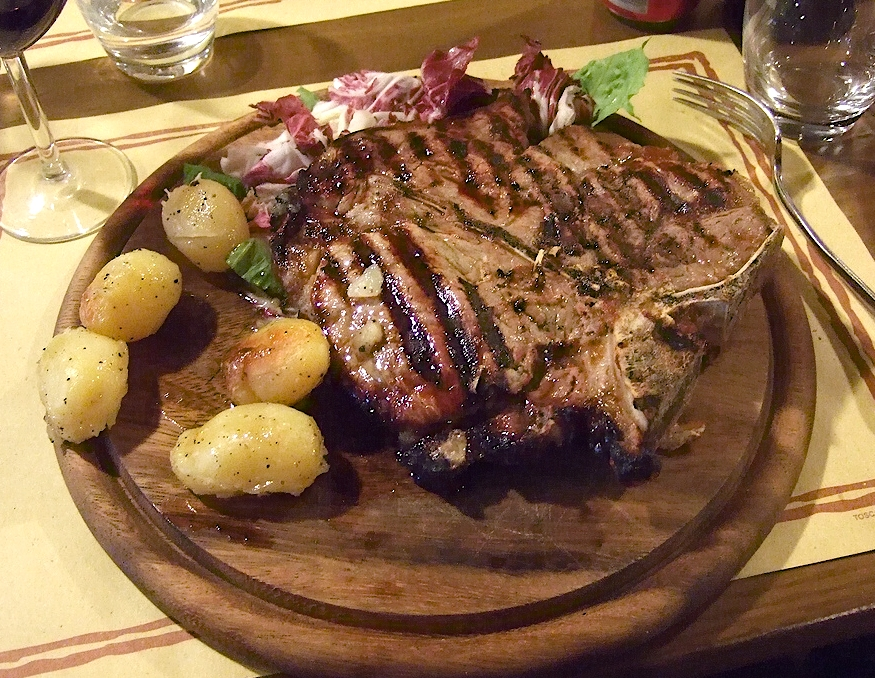
Bistecca alla fiorentina

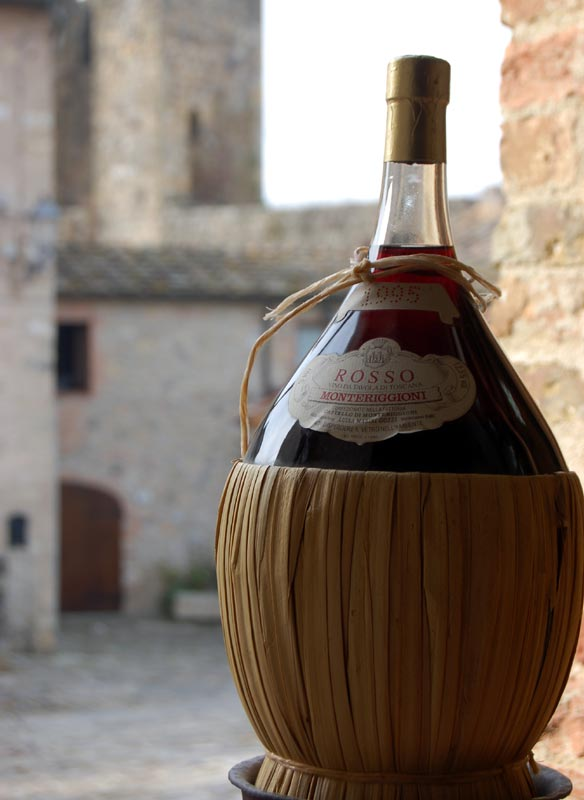
Tuscan Chianti wine in a traditional fiasco

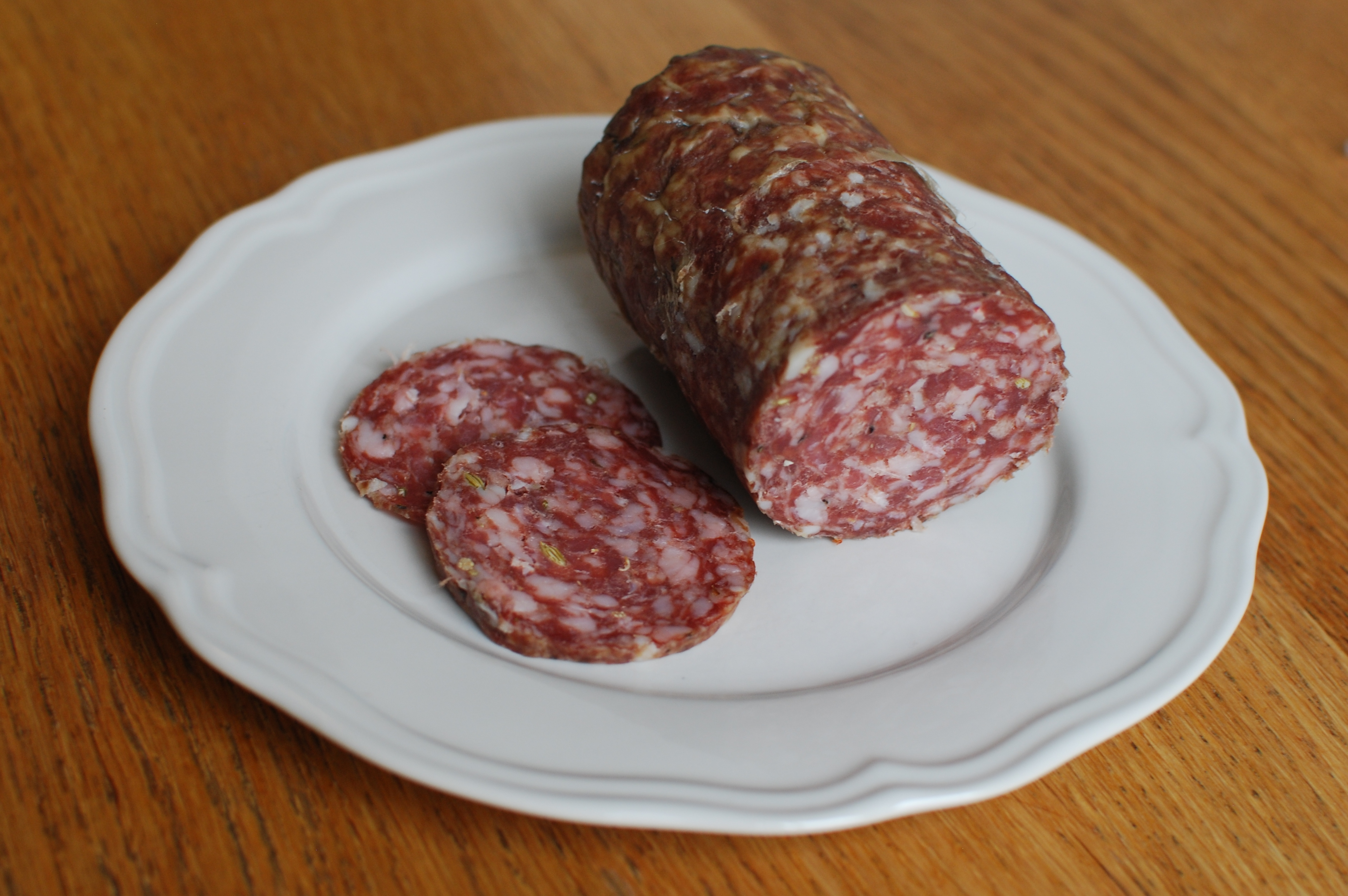
Finocchiona, a classic Tuscan salami

Tuscan cuisine comprises the culinary traditions of the Tuscan region in Italy, celebrated for its simplicity and focus on fresh, high-quality ingredients like olive oil, legumes, and meats. Rooted in the cucina povera (Italian for 'cuisine of the poor'), it emphasizes seasonal ingredients and straightforward flavors over complex sauces and spices.

Tuscany is also home to some of the most famous wines in the world such as Chianti, Brunello di Montalcino, and Vino Nobile di Montepulciano.

Bread plays a very important role in Tuscan cuisine. One specialty of Tuscan cuisine is a white, plain, unsalted bread. This bread accompanies all foods. This bread has its origin in the 16th century when salt was heavily taxed.

== Overview ==
Simplicity is central to the Tuscan cuisine. Legumes, bread, cheese, vegetables, mushrooms, and fresh fruit are used. A good example of typical Tuscan food is ribollita, a notable soup whose name literally means 'reboiled'. Like most Tuscan cuisine, the soup has peasant origins. Ribollita was originally made by reheating (i.e. reboiling) the leftover minestrone or vegetable soup from the previous day. There are many variations, but the main ingredients always include leftover bread, cannellini beans, and inexpensive vegetables such as carrot, cabbage, beans, silverbeet, cavolo nero (Tuscan kale), onion, and olive oil.

A regional Tuscan pasta known as pici resembles thick, grainy-surfaced spaghetti, and is often rolled by hand. White truffles from San Miniato appear in October and November. High-quality beef, used for the traditional Florentine steak, comes from the Chianina cattle breed of the Chiana Valley and the Maremmana from Maremma.

Pork is also produced. The region is well-known also for its rich game, especially wild boar, hare, fallow deer, roe deer, and pheasant that often are used to prepare pappardelle dishes. Maiale Ubriaco, or "Drunken Pork", is another regional preparation in which pork is braised in Chianti wine and often paired with Tuscan kale. Lardo is a salume of cured fatback, served as thin slices or as a paste; a famous variety is lardo di Colonnata.

Regional desserts include cantucci (oblong-shaped almond biscuits), castagnaccio (a chestnut flour cake), pan di ramerino (a sweet bread containing raisins and rosemary), panforte (prepared with honey, fruits, and nuts), ricciarelli (biscuits made using an almond base with sugar, honey, and egg white), necci (galettes made with chestnut flour) and cavallucci (pastry made with almonds, candied fruits, coriander, flour, and honey).

Well-known regional wines include Brunello di Montalcino, Carmignano, Chianti, Morellino di Scansano, Parrina, Sassicaia, and Vernaccia di San Gimignano.

== History ==
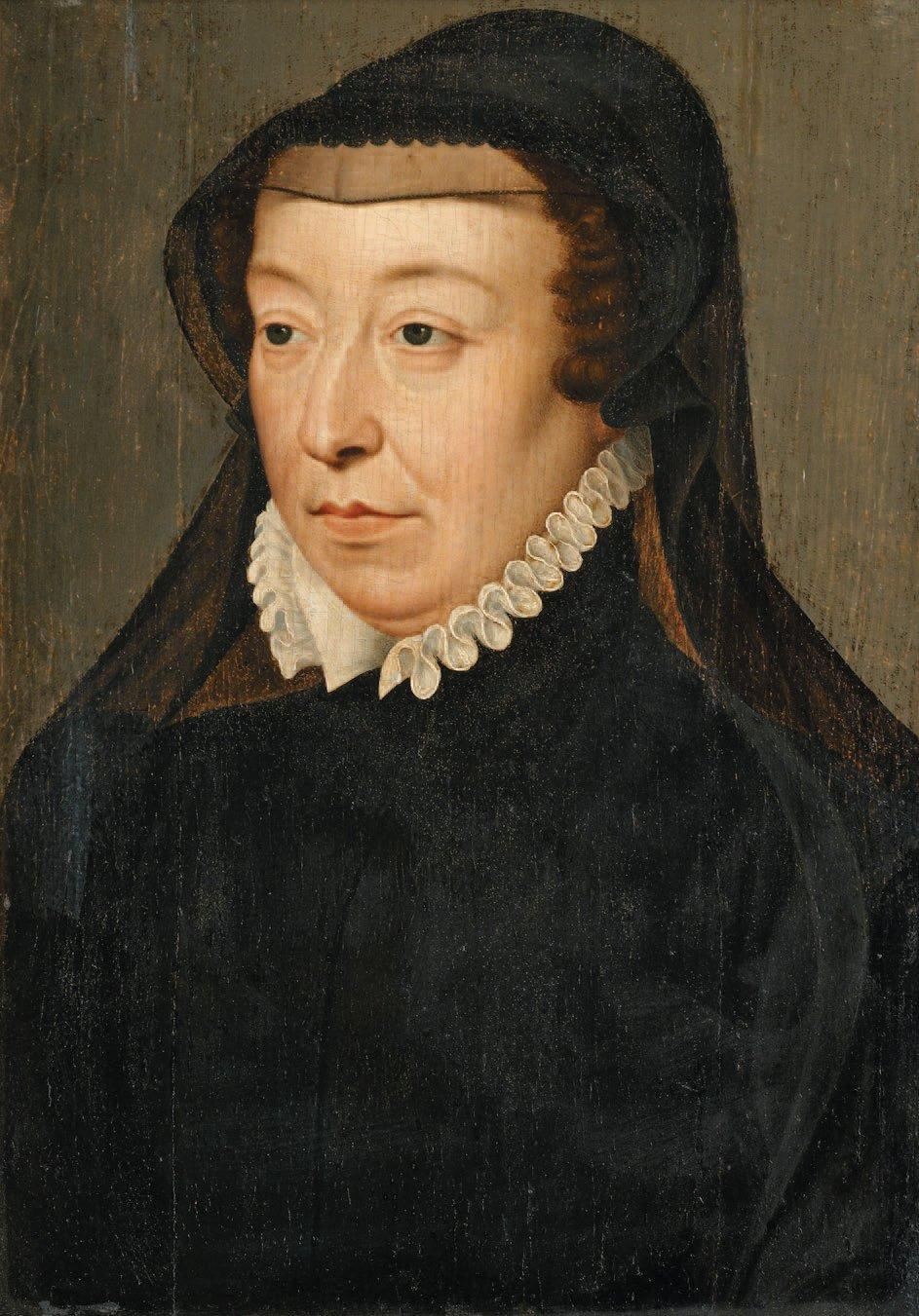
Catherine de' Medici

Tuscan cuisine is a blend of Etruscan and Roman cooking traditions. The Etruscans, who inhabited the region before the rise of Rome, were skilled in viticulture, cultivating grapes and producing their own wines. They also foraged for truffles, an ingredient that became a prized element in their cooking.

The foundations of Tuscan cuisine began to take shape during the Renaissance, particularly under the influence of the Medici family. The Medici not only elevated the quality and sophistication of Tuscan food but also impacted French cuisine through Catherine de' Medici, who brought Tuscan culinary techniques and ingredients to France when she married King Henry II.

In Tuscany's countryside, the tradition of "riuso" developed, driven by the philosophy of "not throwing anything away." This approach led to a resourceful use of ingredients, inspiring iconic dishes like ribollita and panzanella, which transform simple, leftover ingredients into hearty meals.

After the Second World War, the economy dramatically improved and with it the standard of living increased for most Florentines. With this, food moved from being produced locally in quantities just enough to meet needs to being produced for a market economy. Values shifted— people born before the war in times of scarcity viewed food as deeply enjoyable but not to be eaten in excess, while their children did not consider a lack of food, and saw its consumption as "essential to full personhood". The food the younger generations ate contained more meat and fat, fewer legumes and vegetables, and was chosen based on taste and a desire for variety rather than what was available. Some older Tuscan dishes were eaten for nostalgia and others were avoided.

== Breads ==
- Pane di patate della Garfagnana
- Pane sciocco
- Pane Toscano
- Pane di Segale della Lunigiana
- Schiacciata

== Dishes ==
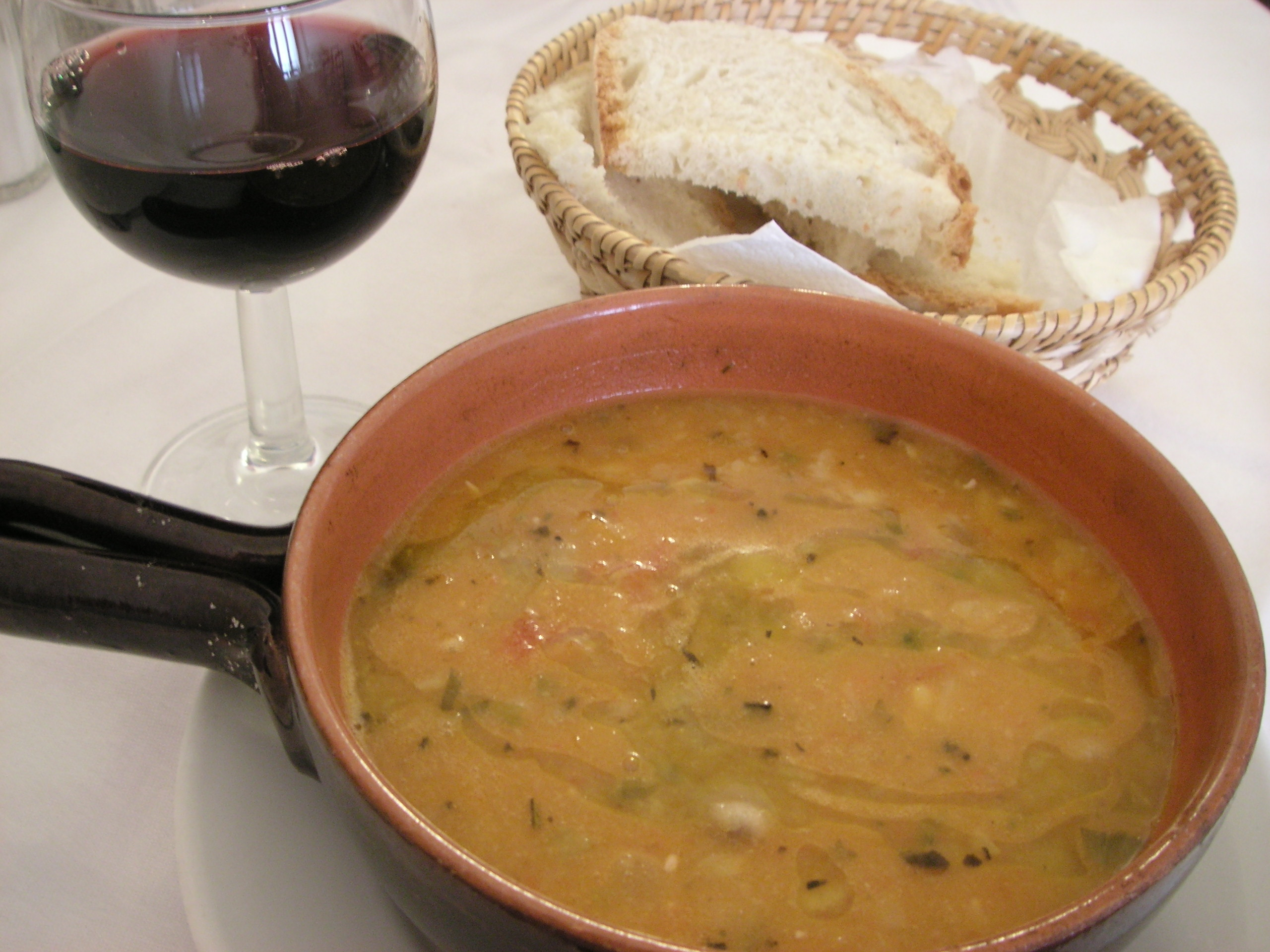
Acquacotta, bean and minestrone soup

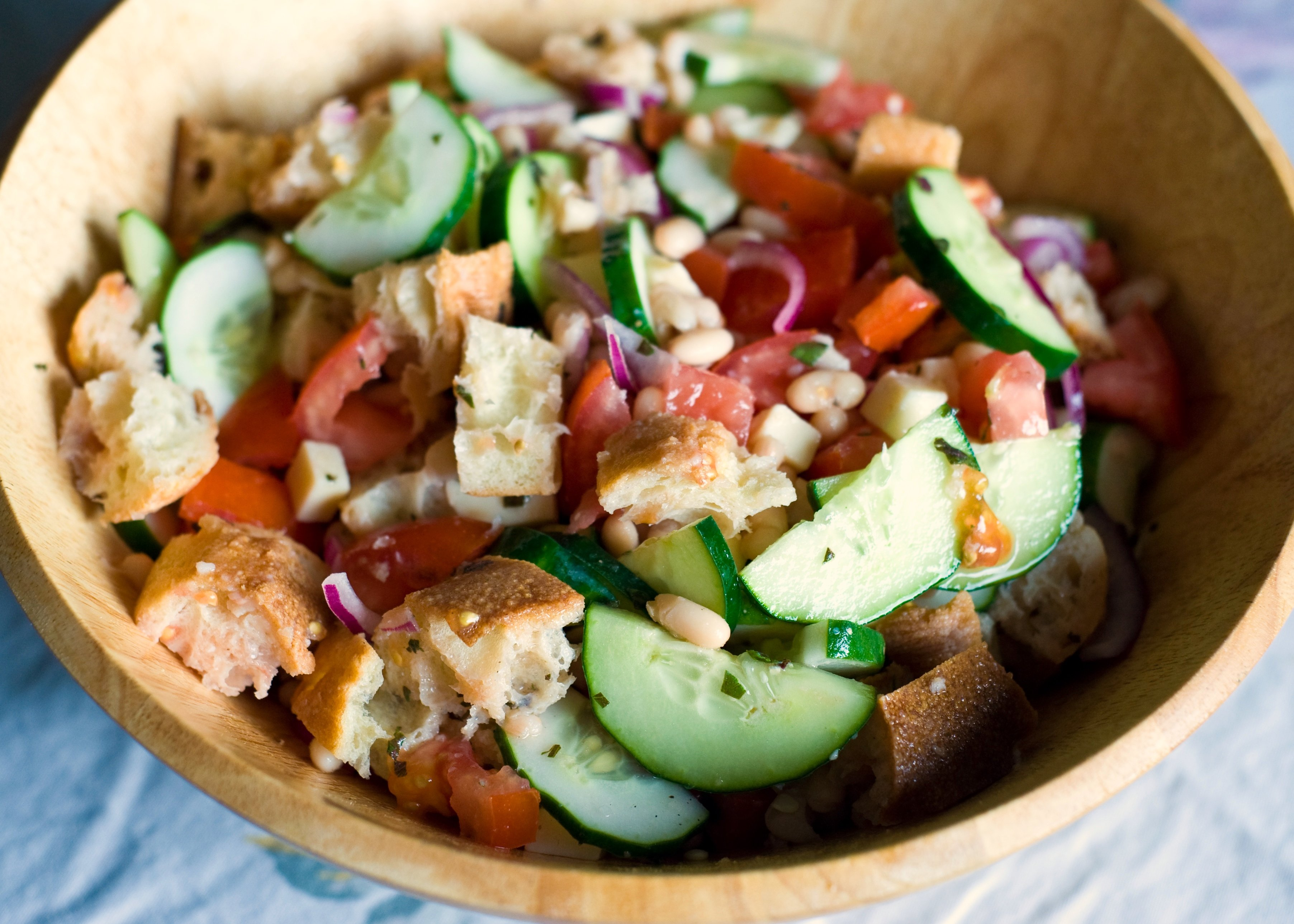
Panzanella

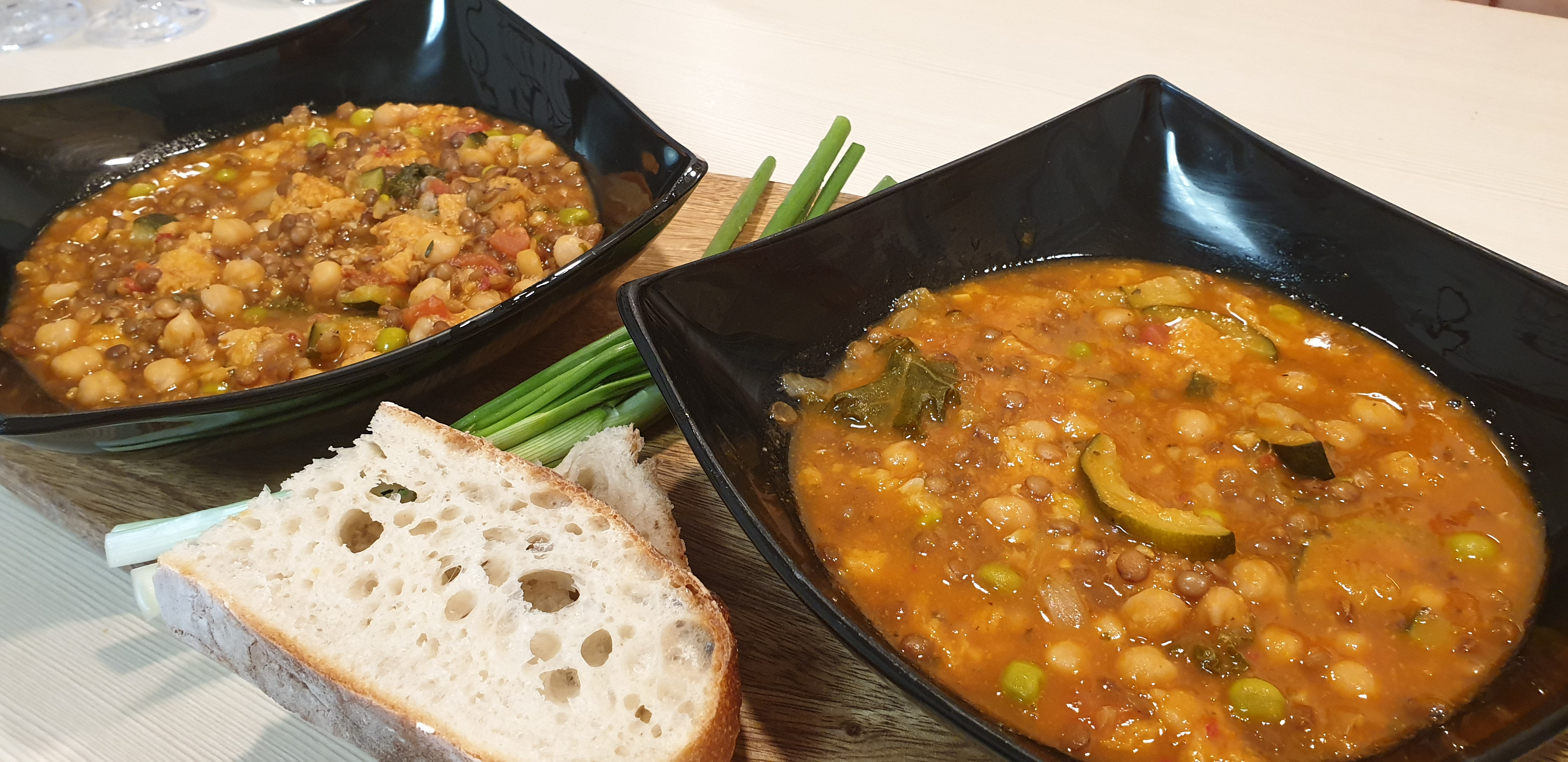
Ribollita

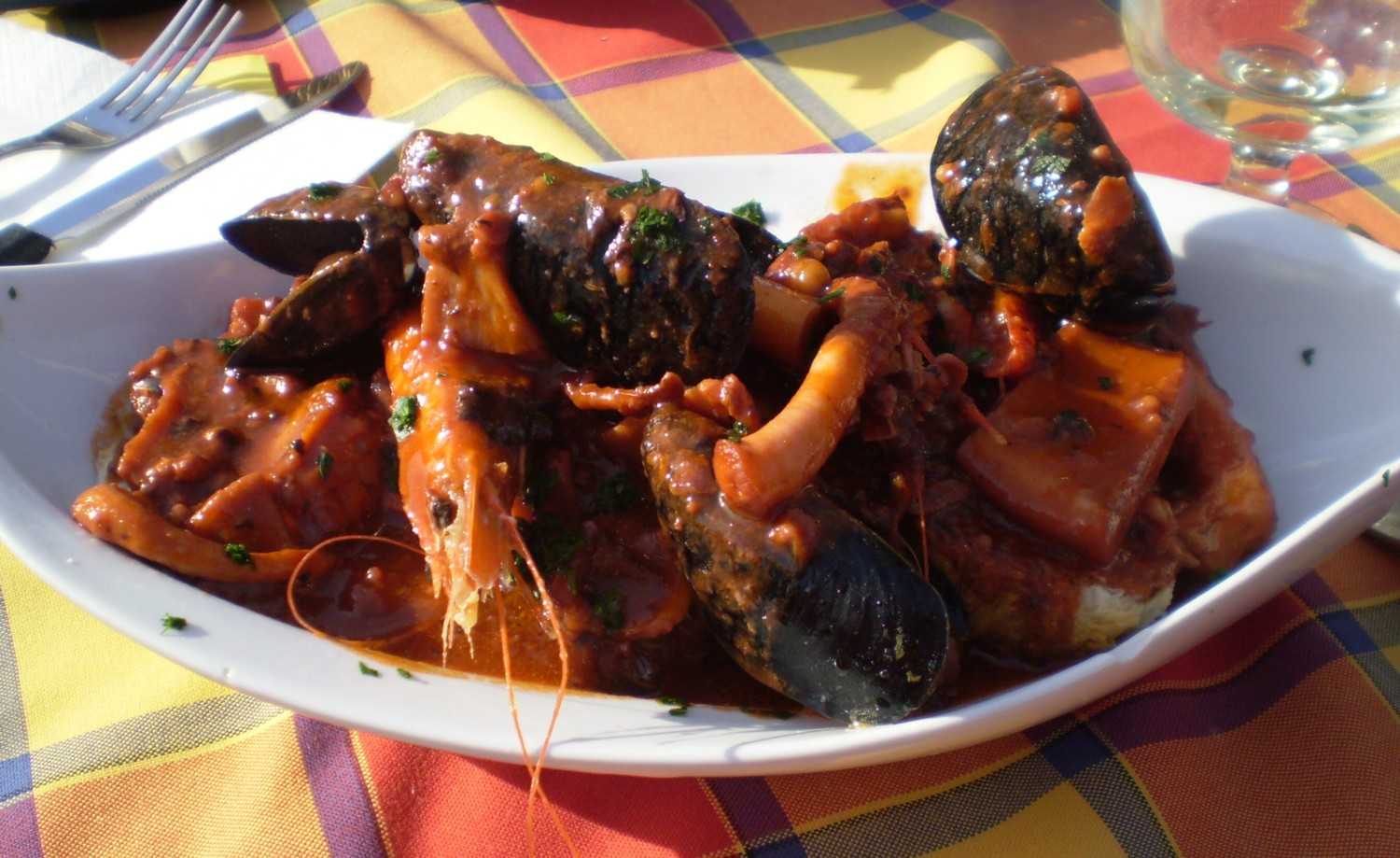
Cacciucco

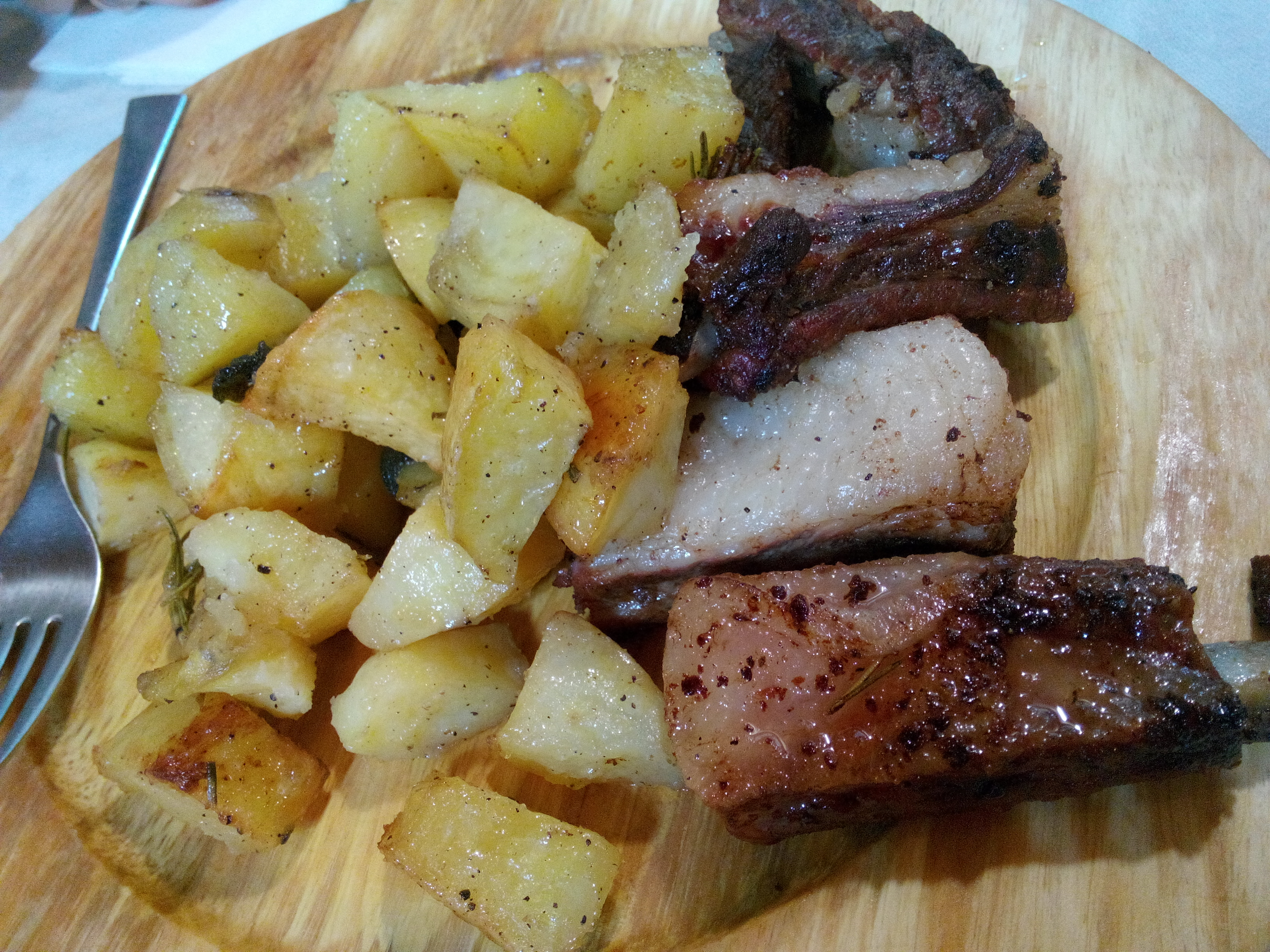
Rosticciana

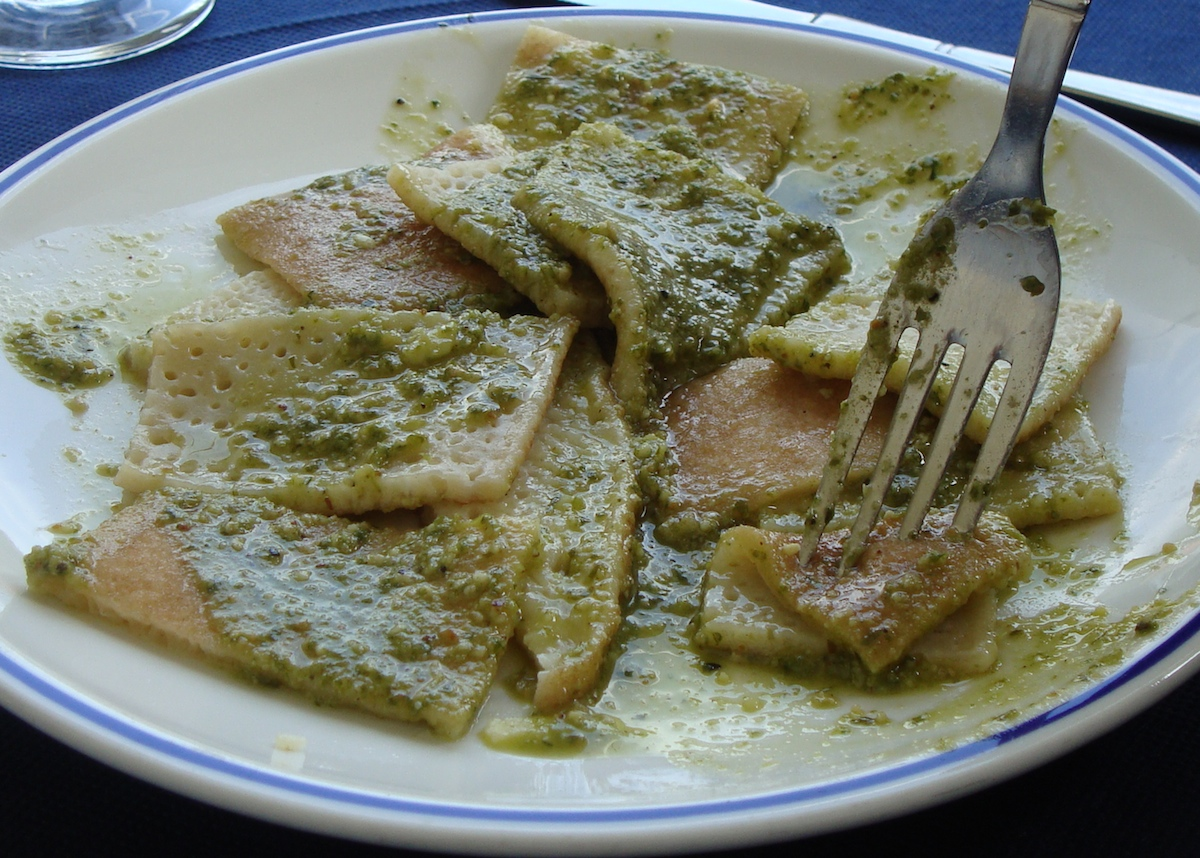
Testaroli

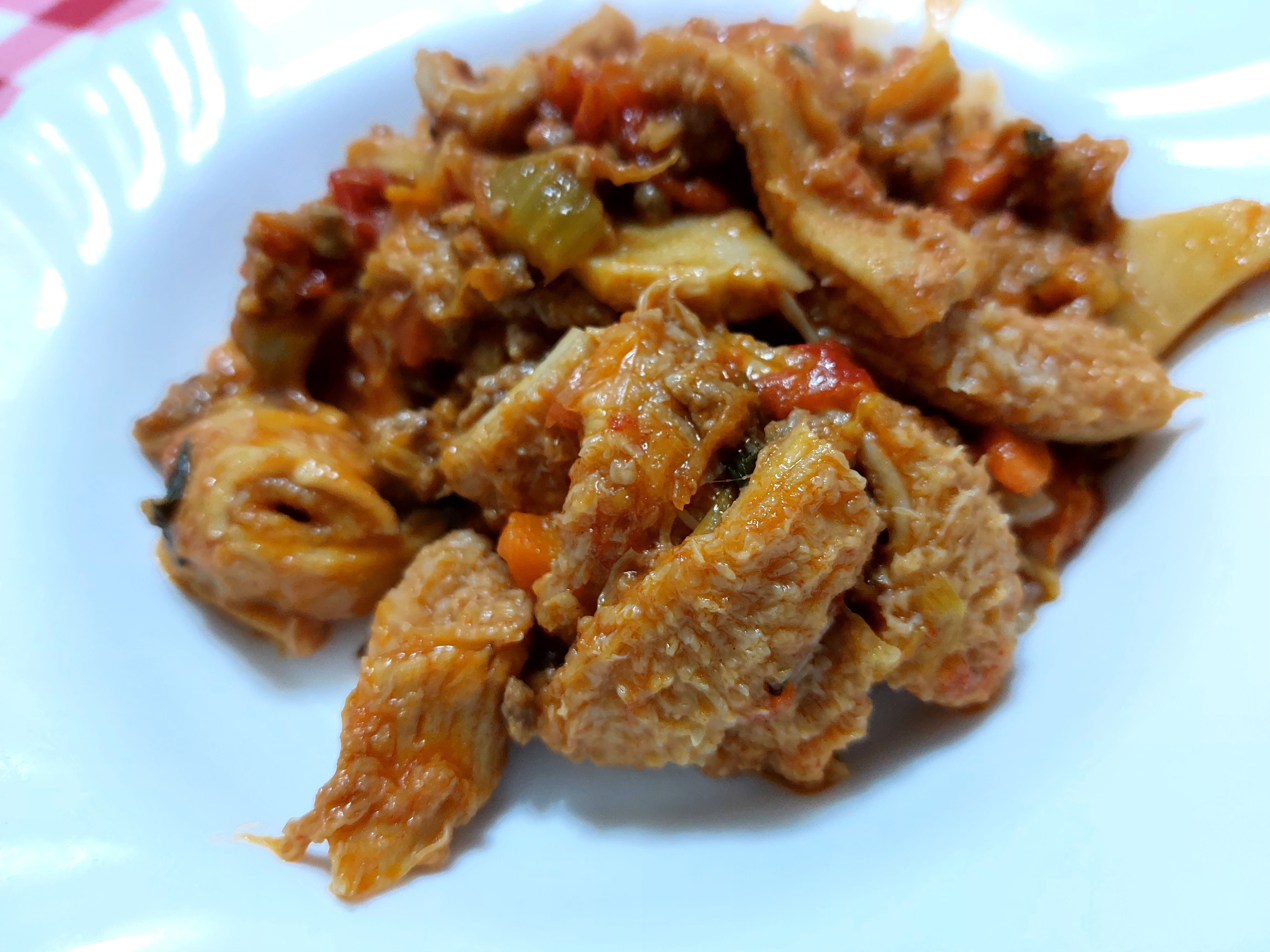
Trippa alla fiorentina

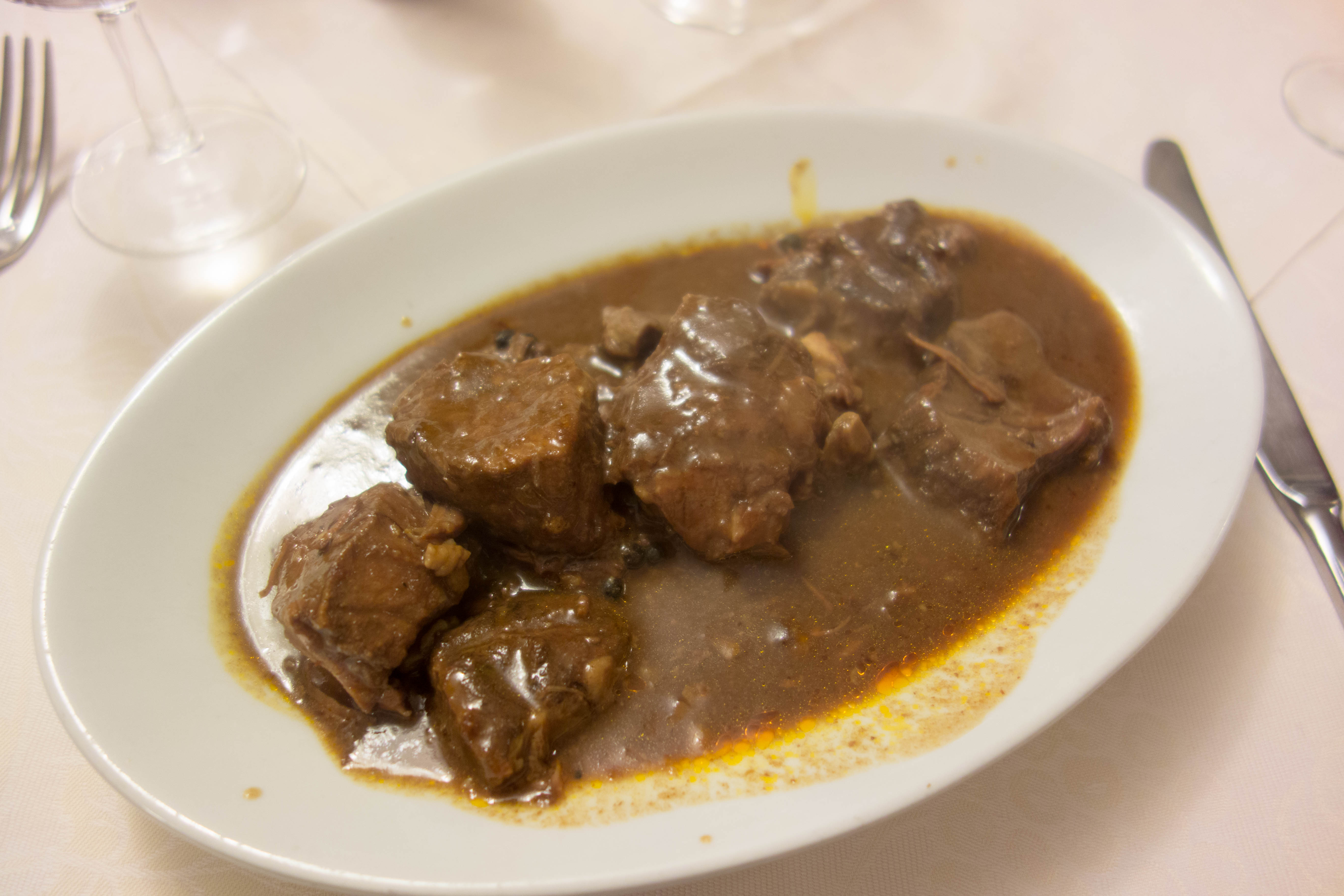
Peposo dell'impruneta

- Acquacotta (its preparation varies from place to place)
- Acquapazza
- Agnellotti
- Anguilla con vino
- Armelette - Lasagne Bastarde
- Arselle alla viareggina
- Arselle in fricassea
- Bavette al ragno
- Bavette alla fornaia o pesto toscano
- Bavette alle acciughe
- Bavette al pesce povero
- Bavette alle triglie
- Bomba di riso
- Bordatino alla Livornese
- Brodo del parto
- Brodo di carne alla toscana
- Brodo di fagiano
- Brodolese o Brodolata
- Brodo di pesce
- Bistecca alla fiorentina
- Cacciucco, alla livornese e alla viareggina
- Caldaro dell'Argentario
- Carcerato
- Cecina
- Cèe in padella
- Cicale di mare alla viareggina
- Coniglio con olive
- Covaccino
- Cozze ripiene alla viareggina
- Crognoli fritti
- Crostini neri
- Cinque e cinque (schiaccina con la cecina)
- Farinata di cavolo nero known as Farinata con le leghe in Pistoia and Bordatino on the coast.
- Fegatelli
- Focaccetta
- Frittata con gli zoccoli
- Gnudi
- Gurguglione
- Insalata di trippa
- Lampredotto
- Manafregoli
- Matuffi alla viareggina
- Mazzancolle e fagioli
- Minestra di farro
- Panigaccio
- Panzanella
- Panzanella fritta, often served as an entré with prosciutto
- Pappa al pomodoro
- Pasta ai sassi
- Pasta con i cannolicchi
- Pasta alla carbonara di mare alla viareggina
- Pasta alla trabaccolara
- Pasta co' nicchi or Spaghetti alle arselle (literally Spaghetti with clams)
- Pasta e fagioli
- Peposo alla viareggina
- Peposo dell'impruneta
- Picchiante
- Polenta e capra
- Pancotto alla viareggina
- Polenta con funghi
- Ribollita
- Risotto alla tinca
- Risotto alla viareggina
- Risotto seppie e bieta
- Rosticciana
- Schiacciata all'olio
- Sedani ripieni alla pratese
- Sfratti
- Sgabeo
- Spaghetti alla viareggina
- Spungata
- Stocco alla Tono
- Taiàrin e còi (tagliarini e cavoli)
- Testaroli (with many variations from place to place)
- Tordelli (the filling varies from place to place)
- Torta d'erbi
- Tortelli di patate
- Tortellini alla boscaiola
- Totani ripieni alla viareggina
- Triglie alla viareggia
- Trippa alla fiorentina
- Trippa di mare
- Zuppa alla frantoiana
- Zuppa di cavolo nero
- Zuppa di ceci
- Zuppa di pane

== Cured meats ==
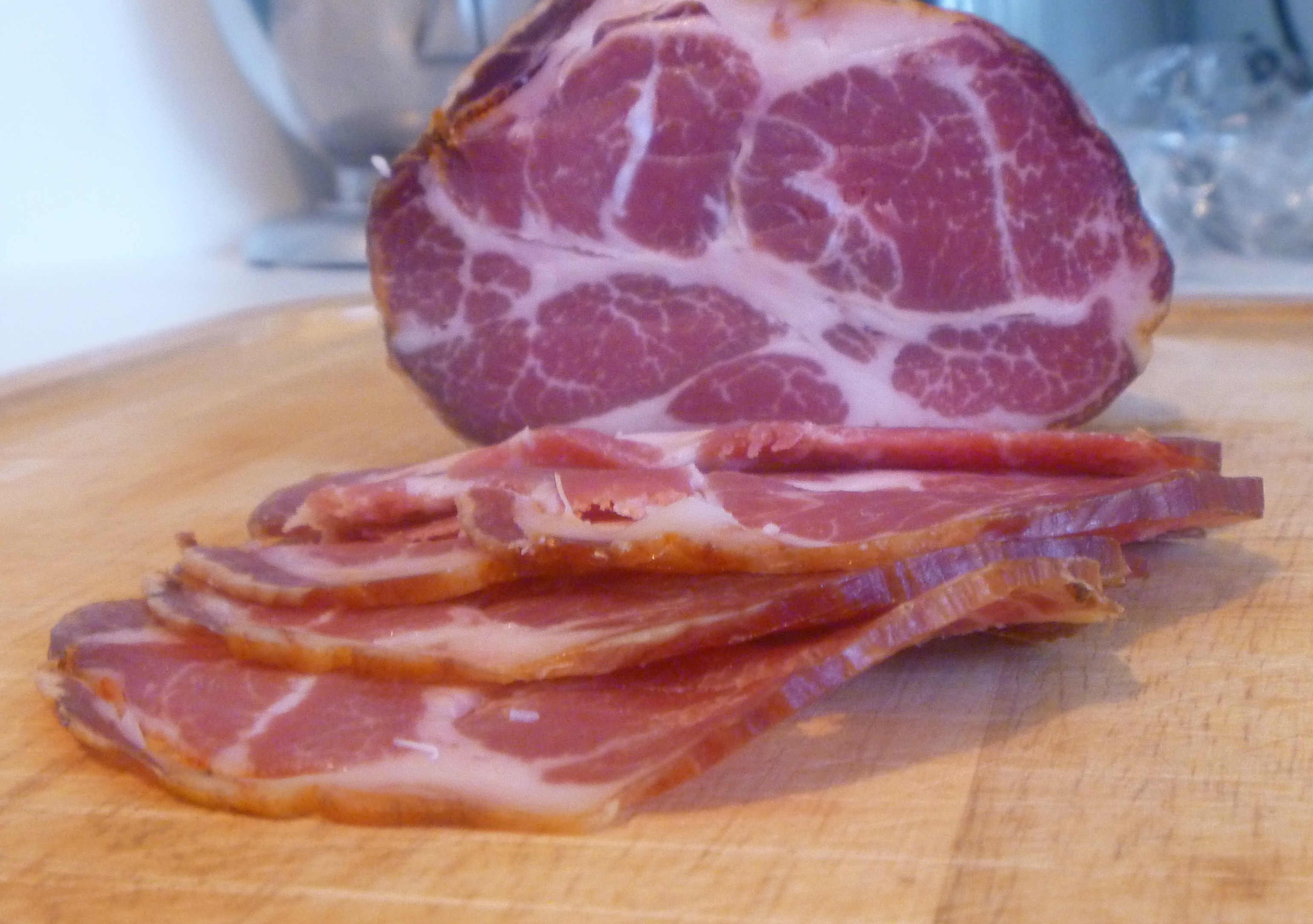
Capocollo

- Biroldo
- Capocollo
- Mondiola
- Pancetta
- Prosciutto Toscano
- Tizzone

== Desserts ==
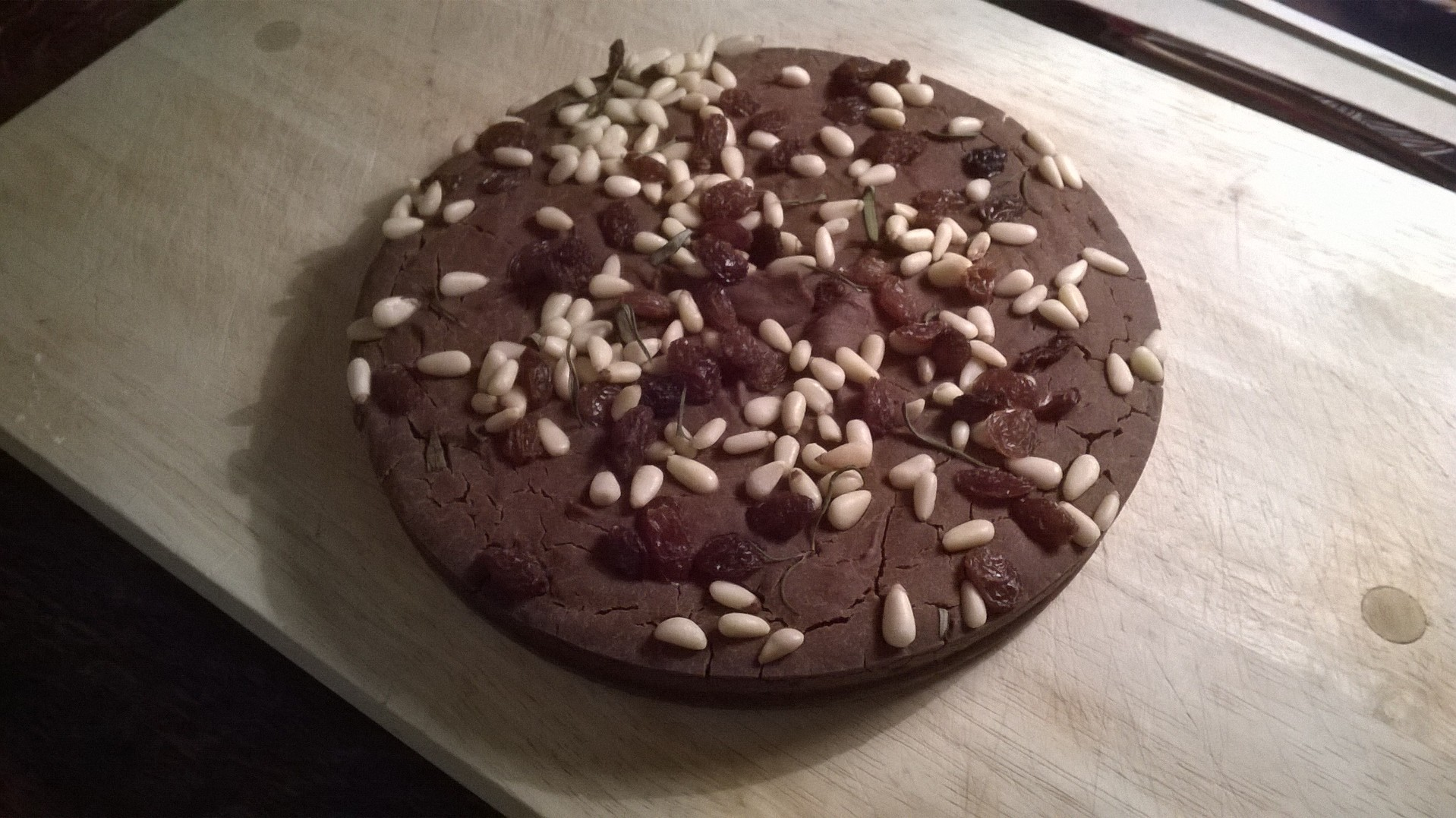
Castagnaccio

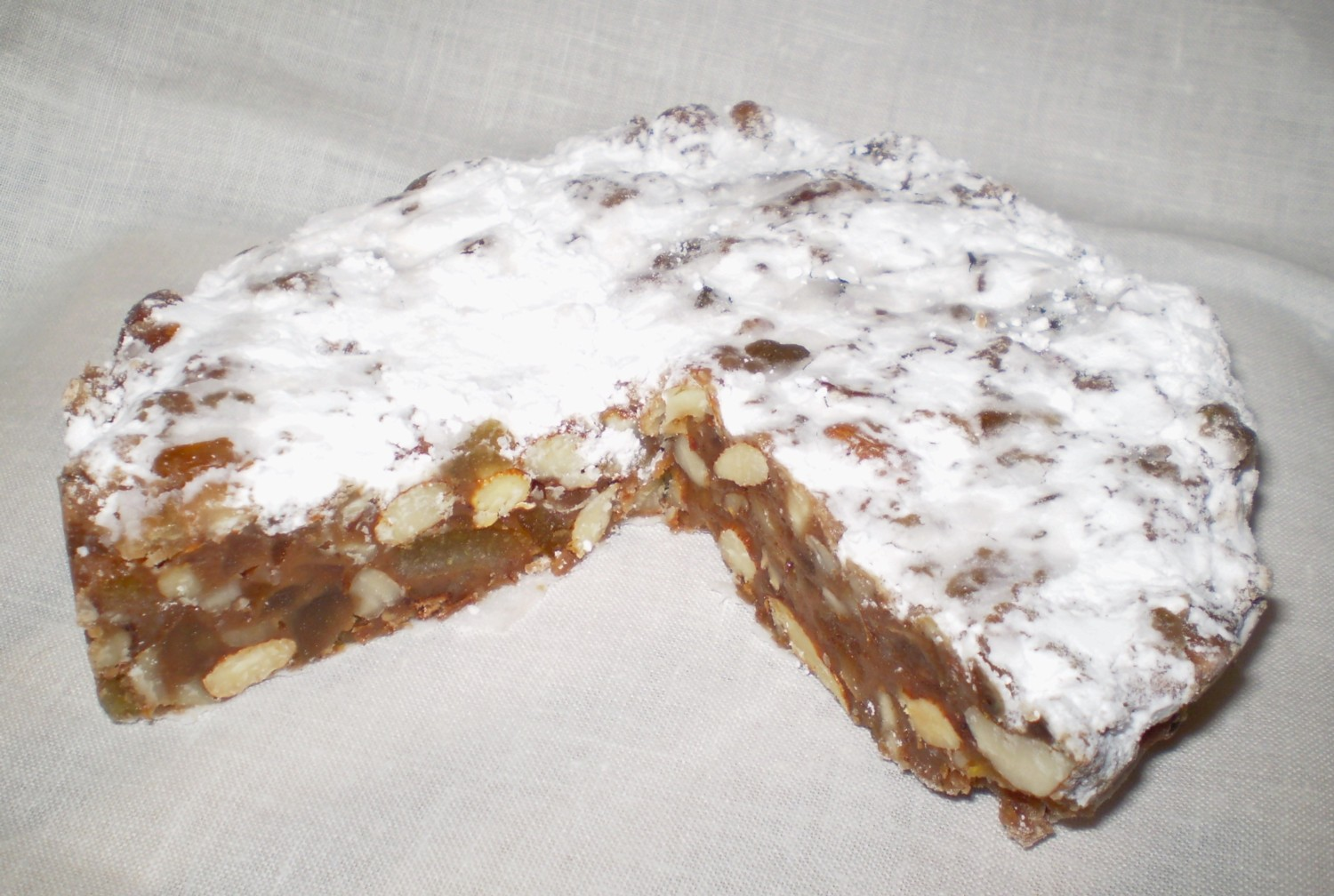
Panforte

- Ballonciori
- Befanini or Befanotti
- Bolli livornesi
- Bomboloni (can be with or without filling)
- Castagnaccio
- Cenci or Cencetti
- Frittelle di riso
- Mondine
- Necci
- Panforte
- Pan di ramerino
- Pasimata
- Pupporina
- Scarpaccia alla viareggina
- Torta della nonna
- Torta di riso or Torta di riso al cioccolato; also known as torta coi pizzi or coi becchi
- Torta di pepe

== Wines ==
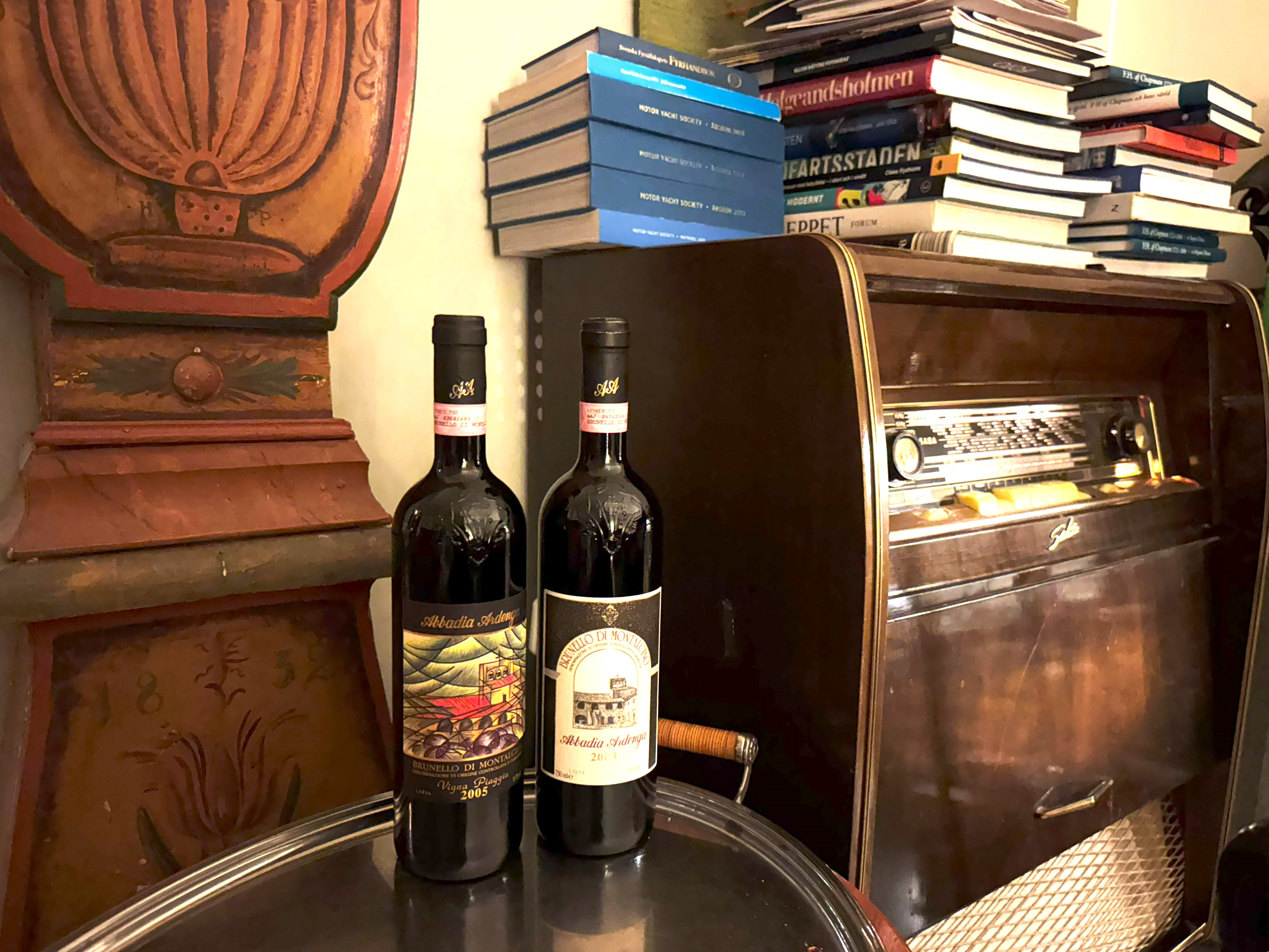
Bottles of Brunello di Montalcino

- Brunello di Montalcino
- Carmignano
- Chianti

== See also ==
- Italian cuisine
- Cuisine of Abruzzo
- Apulian cuisine
- Arbëreshë cuisine
- Emilian cuisine
- Cuisine of Liguria
- Lombard cuisine
- Cuisine of Mantua
- Cuisine of Basilicata
- Neapolitan cuisine
- Piedmontese cuisine
- Roman cuisine
- Cuisine of Sardinia
- Sicilian cuisine
- Venetian cuisine
- Tuscan wines

== Bibliography ==
- Chrzan, Janet A. (2008). "Culinary Tourism in Tuscany: Media Fantasies, Imagined Traditions and Transformative Travel". In Lysaght, Patricia (ed.). Tourism and Museum: Sanitas per Aquas, Spas, Lifestyles and Foodways. Innsbruck: StudienVerlag. pp. 235–251.
- Piras, Claudia; Madigani, Eugenio (2000). Culinaria Italy. ISBN 978-3829029018.
