= Tuscan =

Tuscan may refer to:

== Places ==
- A person from, or something of, from, or related to Tuscany, a region of Italy
- Tuscan Archipelago, islands off Tuscany, Italy.
- Tuscan, South Australia was a railway siding and locality in the Murray Mallee region of South Australia

== Currency ==
- Tuscan pound
- Tuscan florin

== Linguistics ==
- Etruscan language, an extinct language which gives its name to Tuscany
- Tuscan dialect, a central Italian dialectal group from which Italian first emerged
- Tuscan gorgia, a phonetic sound

== Cars ==
- TVR Tuscan (disambiguation), sports cars manufactured by TVR
  - TVR Tuscan Challenge, a motorsport event for TVR Tuscan cars

== Other uses ==
- Tuscan cuisine
- Tuscan melon, a melon cultivated in Tuscany, Italy
- Tuscan order, an architectural order
- Tuscan Dairy Farms, an American company
- Tuscan red, a color
- HMS Tuscan, several ships of the Royal Navy
- Tuscan (ship), several merchant ships
- Tuscan Sun Festival, a music and culture festival in Florence, Italy
- Tuscan, "Tipoff US/Canada", a database of possible terrorists linked with US Terrorist Identities Datamart Environment
- Tuscan, a slab serif typeface
- The Tuscan Grand Prix, a Formula 1 race

== See also ==
- Etruscan (disambiguation)
- Toscano (disambiguation)
- Tucson, Arizona, a city, sometimes misspelled "Tuscan"
- Tuscany (disambiguation)
- Tusken Raiders
