= Tuscon =

Tuscon may refer to:

- TusCon, science fiction convention
- Tucson, Arizona, commonly misspelled

== See also ==
- Tuscan (disambiguation)
