= Tosco =

Tosco may refer to:

- Tosco, synonym of Toscano, meaning "from Tuscany".
- Tosco (grape), another name for the Italian wine grape Uva Tosca
- Appennino Tosco-Emiliano National Park, a state-held natural preserve in northern-central Italy.
- Agustín Tosco, an Argentine union leader,
- Tosco Corporation (The Oil Shale COrporation), a U.S. oil corporation, now part of ConocoPhillips.
- Toscotec, an Italian company
- TOSCO II process, a shale oil extraction technology
- MV Tosco, an Italian coastal tanker

== See also ==
- Toschi (disambiguation)
- Etruscan (disambiguation)
- Tuscan (disambiguation)
- Tuscany (disambiguation)
