= Tesco (disambiguation) =

Tesco PLC is an international retailer with headquarters in the United Kingdom.

Tesco may also refer to:

- Tesco Corporation, a defunct provider of services for the oil industry
- Tesco Organisation, a German record label
- Tesco Vee, musician and co-founder of Touch and Go Records
- Nicky Tesco, member of British punk rock band The Members

== See also ==
- Tasco (disambiguation)
- Tosco (disambiguation)
