= List of ships named Tuscan =

Several ships have been named Tuscan for people and things pertaining to the region of Tuscany:

- Tuscan (1793 ship) was built at Hull and made one voyage (1795–1797) for the British East India Company. A French privateer captured her in 1798, but she returned to British hands c.1805. She was wrecked at Memel in November 1823.
- The French 16-gun brig Ronco was launched in April 1808. The British Royal Navy captured her in May and she became HMS Tuscan. The Navy sold her in 1818 and she became a whaler, making six whaling voyages before being condemned during her seventh in 1840 as no longer seaworthy.

== See also ==
- HMS Tuscan
- SS Tuscania
