= List of shipwrecks in November 1823 =

The list of shipwrecks in November 1823 includes all ships sunk, foundered, grounded, or otherwise lost during November 1823.

== 1 November ==
List of shipwrecks: 1 November 1823
Ship	State	Description
Alida Jantina	Netherlands	The ship was abandoned in the Atlantic Ocean off the Isles of Scilly with the loss of a crew member. Survivors were rescued by Artuosa (United Kingdom). She was on a voyage from Liverpool, Lancashire, United Kingdom to Antwerp.
Elizabeth	United Kingdom	The ship was driven ashore at Saint-Brieuc, Côtes-du-Nord, France. She was on a voyage from London to Paraíba, Brazil.
Exchange	United Kingdom	The ship was wrecked at Arromanches, Calvados, France with the loss of all but her captain. She was on a voyage from Wexford to London.
Experiment	United Kingdom	The ship capsized in the Irish Sea off the coast of Wigtownshire. Her crew were rescued. She was subsequently righted and taken in to Glencaple.
Freedom	United Kingdom	The ship was driven ashore at Scarborough, Yorkshire. Her crew were rescued by the Scarborough Lifeboat. She was refloated on 3 November.
Freundschaft	Bremen	The galiot was abandoned in the Atlantic Ocean. Her twelve crew were rescued by Lancaster (United Kingdom). She was on a voyage from the Gambia River to Jersey, Channel Islands.
Friends	United Kingdom	The ship was wrecked at "Nucqueville", Calvados with the loss of seven of the ten people on board. She was on a voyage from Rio de Janeiro, Brazil to Hamburg.
Friendship	United Kingdom	The ship was lost at Jersey, Channel Islands.
Good Intent	United Kingdom	The ship foundered off Grimsay, Outer Hebrides. She was reported to be on a voyage from Wick, Caithness to "Dorchester".
Isis	United Kingdom	The ship was driven ashore and wrecked at Portland, Dorset.
Joseph	United Kingdom	The ship was abandoned in the Atlantic Ocean off the Isles of Scilly.
Joseph and Jane	(United Kingdom of Great Britain and Ireland) Jersey	The ship was wrecked on the north coast of Jersey, Channel Islands. Her crew were rescued. She was on a voyage from Plymouth, Devon to Jersey.
Joseph and Mary	United Kingdom	The ship was abandoned in the Atlantic Ocean 30 nautical miles (56 km) off the Isles of Scilly with the loss of a crew member. Survivors were rescued by Liberty (United Kingdom). Joseph and Mary was on a voyage from Málaga to Cork.
Lady Popham	United Kingdom	The ship was driven ashore and wrecked at Margate. All on board were rescued. She was on a voyage from London to Gibraltar.
Minerva	United Kingdom	The ship capsized in the Irish Sea off the coast of Wigtownshire. Her crew were rescued.
Paris	United States	The ship was driven ashore near Cherbourg, Seine-Inférieure, France. All on board were rescued.
Stert	United Kingdom	The ship foundered in the English Channel off Morlaix Finistère, France. Her crew were rescued. She was on a voyage from Bilbao, Spain to London.
Susannah	United Kingdom	The sloop struck the Runnel Stone, off Gwennap Head, Cornwall and foundered. Her crew were rescued by a pilot boat. She was on a voyage from Bristol, Gloucestershire to Alderney, Channel Islands.
Trusty	United Kingdom	The ship was driven ashore and sank at Scarborough. Her crew were rescued by the Scarborough Lifeboat.
Wellington	United Kingdom	The ship was driven ashore at Arromanches. She was on a voyage from Chester, Cheshire to London. Wellington was refloated in mid-November and repaired.

== 2 November ==
List of shipwrecks: 2 November 1823
Ship	State	Description
Aberdonian	United Kingdom	The ship was driven ashore and wrecked 6 nautical miles (11 km) east of Ilfracombe, Devon with the loss of all hands.
Hero	United Kingdom	The brig foundered in Swansea Bay. Her crew were rescued. She was later refloated and taken in to Swansea, Glamorgan for repairs.
Marys	United Kingdom	The ship was lost on the Cabel Grounds, in the Baltic Sea. She was on a voyage from Saint Petersburg, Russian Empire to London.
Patty	United Kingdom	The ship was wrecked on the Long Sand, in the North Sea off Harwich, Essex.
Proteus	United Kingdom	The ship was lost off Cherbourg, Seine-Inférieure, France with the loss of three of her crew. She was on a voyage from London to British Honduras.
Sophia von Oldenburg	Grand Duchy of Oldenburg	The ship was wrecked at Les Sables-d'Olonne, Vendée, France.
Union	United Kingdom	The ship was driven ashore in the Lymington River. She was on a voyage from Málaga, Spain to London. Union was refloated on 4 November.

== 4 November ==
List of shipwrecks: 4 November 1823
Ship	State	Description
Catharine	United Kingdom	The ship was wrecked on the Middle Sand, in the North Sea with the loss of three of her crew. She was on a voyage from Newcastle upon Tyne, Northumberland to London.
Darby	United Kingdom	The ship was lost on the coast of Lincolnshire.
Friendship	United Kingdom	The ship was wrecked at Jersey, Channel Islands.
Globe	United Kingdom	The ship was wrecked at Swanage, Dorset. Her crew were rescued.
Iris	Sweden	The ship was driven ashore at Portland, Dorset with the loss of three of her seven crew. She was on a voyage from St. Ubes, Portugal to Stockholm.
Jason	United Kingdom	The ship was lost on the coast of Lincolnshire.
John	United Kingdom	The ship was lost on the coast of Lincolnshire.
Neath Castle	United Kingdom	The ship was lost on the coast of Lincolnshire.
Patty	United Kingdom	The ship was wrecked on the Long Sand, in the North Sea off Harwich, Essex.
Selby	United Kingdom	The ship was driven ashore at Brighton, Sussex.
Siren	flag unknown	The ship foundered in the English Channel off Jersey, Channel Islands. Three survivors were rescued. She was on a voyage from St. Ubes to Gävle, Sweden.

== 5 November ==
List of shipwrecks: 5 November 1823
Ship	State	Description
Ann	United Kingdom	The sloop foundered in the Bristol Channel off Bideford, Devon. Her crew were rescued. She was on a voyage from Cardiff.Glamorgan yo Wexford.
Ann & Isabella	United Kingdom	The ship was driven ashore on the south coast of Cuba. She was on a voyage from Jamaica to Pictou, Nova Scotia, British North America.
James and Mary	United Kingdom	The ship was driven ashore and wrecked at Dungeness, Kent. Her crew were rescued. She was on a voyage from Caen, Calvados to Newcastle upon Tyne, Northumberland
Juno	United Kingdom	The collier was driven ashore at Saltfleet, Lincolnshire.
Speedwell	United Kingdom	The ship was driven ashore at Grimsby, Lincolnshire.
Trio	United Kingdom	The ship was driven ashore and sank near Great Yarmouth, Norfolk. She was on a voyage from Swansea, Glamorgan to Great Yarmouth. Trio had been refloated and taken in to Great Yarmouth for repairs by 22 November.

== 6 November ==
List of shipwrecks: 6 November 1823
Ship	State	Description
Stag	United Kingdom	The ship was wrecked in the Bay of Luce with the loss of all four crew. Her passenger was rescued. She was on a voyage from Peel, Isle of Man to Greenock, Renfrewshire.

== 7 November ==
List of shipwrecks: 7 November 1823
Ship	State	Description
Dumfries	United Kingdom	The ship ran aground and capsized near "Blexum". She was later refloated and taken in to Geestendorf, Bremen.
Renown	(United Kingdom of Great Britain and Ireland) British North America	The ship was driven ashore near Shelburne, Nova Scotia.
Thomas and Ann	United Kingdom	The ship was wrecked at Kinsale, County Cork with the loss of two of her crew.

== 8 November ==
List of shipwrecks: 8 November 1823
Ship	State	Description
Ann	United Kingdom	The ship was driven ashore and sank at Margate, Kent. Her crew were rescued. She was on a voyage Selby, Yorkshire to Ramsgate, Kent.
Ann	United Kingdom	The ship was driven ashore crewless at Bergen, Norway. She was on a voyage from Arkhangelsk, Russia to Dumbarton.
Catharine	United Kingdom	The ship was wrecked on the Middle Sand, in the North Sea off the coast of Essex with the loss of three of her crew. She was on a voyage from Newcastle upon Tyne, Northumberland to London.
Courier	United Kingdom	The ship was driven ashore at Bolderāja, Russia. She was refloated on 16 November.

== 10 November ==
List of shipwrecks: 10 November 1823
Ship	State	Description
Fortuna	(United Kingdom of Great Britain and Ireland) British North America	The ship was wrecked at "Fermase". Her crew were rescued.
Harmony	United Kingdom	The ship was driven ashore and wrecked at Glenelg, Ross-shire. Her crew were rescued.
Henrietta	(United Kingdom of Great Britain and Ireland) Guernsey	The schooner was wrecked on Ponta Cais, Maio, Cape Verde Islands. She was on a voyage from Porto, Portugal to Rio de Janeiro, Brazil.
Iris	Sweden	The brig was wrecked on Chesil Beach, Dorset, United Kingdom.
Junius	United States	The ship was driven ashore and wrecked 18 nautical miles (33 km) south of Cape Henry, Virginia. She was on a voyage from Málaga, Spain to Baltimore, Maryland.
Margaret	United States	The ship was abandoned in the Atlantic Ocean. Her crew were rescued by Florenzo (Spain). Margaret was on a voyage from Bath, Maine, to Antigua.
Titus	United Kingdom	The ship was wrecked in the Dardanelles.
Victoria	United Kingdom	The ship ran aground on the Mayaguana Reef, she was refloated but had to be beached on Crooked Island, Bahamas. Victoria was on a voyage from Jamaica to Halifax, Nova Scotia, British North America.

== 13 November ==
List of shipwrecks: 13 November 1823
Ship	State	Description
Charlotte	United Kingdom	The ship was in collision with a number of other vessels and was consequently beached at North Shields, County Durham.
Ferdinand	Prussia	The ship was driven ashore at Elsinore, Denmark. She was on a voyage from London, United Kingdom to Swinemünde.
Stag	(United Kingdom of Great Britain and Ireland) Isle of Man	The sloop was wrecked in the Bay of Luce with the loss of four of the five people on board. She was on a voyage from Peel to Greenock, Renfrewshire.

== 14 November ==
List of shipwrecks: 14 November 1823
Ship	State	Description
Emanuel	Sweden	The ship was wrecked on the Tegeler's Bank, at the mouth of the Weser with the loss of all hands. She was on a voyage from Stockholm to Bremen.
Town Mistico Felicity	Spain	The ship was driven ashore at Palmones. All on board survived. She was on a voyage from "Sallce" to Tétouan, Morocco.

== 15 November ==
List of shipwrecks: 15 November 1823
Ship	State	Description
Isabella	United Kingdom	The ship capsized in the Adriatic Sea in a squall with the loss of three of her ten crew. Survivors were rescued by a fishing vessel. Isabella was on a voyage from Trieste to Liverpool, Lancashire. She was taken in to Ancona, Papal States on 24 November
John	United Kingdom	The ship was wrecked in St. George's Bay, Newfoundland, British North America. Her crew were rescued by an American brig.

== 16 November ==
List of shipwrecks: 16 November 1823
Ship	State	Description
Mayflower	(United Kingdom of Great Britain and Ireland) British North America	The ship was driven ashore on Cape Breton Island, Nova Scotia with the loss of two lives. She was on a voyage from Halifax, Nova Scotia to Newfoundland.

== 17 November ==
List of shipwrecks: 17 November 1823
Ship	State	Description
Codfish	(United Kingdom of Great Britain and Ireland) British North America	The ship was driven ashore and wrecked on "Cape Brayle". Her crew were rescued.
Germania	Bremen	The ship was driven ashore on "Rune". She was on a voyage from Bremen to Riga, Russia.
Harmony	United Kingdom	The ship was wrecked on a rock in the Sound of Kylerea. She was on a voyage from Wick, Caithness to Belfast, County Antrim.
Tuscan	United Kingdom	The ship was driven ashore and wrecked at Memel, Prussia. Her crew were rescued. She was on a voyage from Memel to London.

== 18 November ==
List of shipwrecks: 18 November 1823
Ship	State	Description
Andromache	United States	The ship ran aground on the Florida Reef. She was on a voyage from Jamaica to New York.

== 19 November ==
List of shipwrecks: 19 November 1823
Ship	State	Description
Britannia	United Kingdom	The ship was driven ashore and wrecked on North Haft Island. She was on a voyage from Kunda, Russia to London.
Edward	United Kingdom	The ship was driven ashore and capsized in the River Liffey. She was on a voyage from Dublin to Liverpool, Lancashire.
Mary and Acshsa Ann	United States	The ship was wrecked on the Hog Island Shoals, in the Atlantic Ocean off Hog Island, Pennsylvania. She was on a voyage from Havana, Cuba to Philadelphia, Pennsylvania.

== 20 November ==
List of shipwrecks: 20 November 1823
Ship	State	Description
Albion	United Kingdom	The paddle steamer was driven ashore and wrecked at Largs, Ayrshire.
King George	United Kingdom	The ship foundered 20 nautical miles (37 km) north of Fair Isle with the loss of two of her three crew. The survivor was rescued by Brothers (United Kingdom). King George was on a voyage from "Scullorny" to Leith, Lothian.
Peggy	(United Kingdom of Great Britain and Ireland) British North America	The schooner was wrecked in the Atlantic Ocean with the loss of three of her five crew. The survivors were rescued on 5 December by Jason (United Kingdom). She was on a voyage from Halifax, Nova Scotia to London, United Kingdom.
Penrose	United Kingdom	The brig was driven ashore and wrecked at Macrihanish, Argyllshire. Her crew were rescued. She was on a voyage from Westport, County Mayo to Liverpool, Lancashire.

== 21 November ==
List of shipwrecks: 21 November 1823
Ship	State	Description
Diamond	United Kingdom	The sloop was run down and sunk in the North Sea off Coquet Island, Northumberland by Triumph (United Kingdom). Her crew were rescued by Triumph.
Fortuna	Prussia	The ship was wrecked at Hela. She was on a voyage from Memel to London, United Kingdom.

== 22 November ==
List of shipwrecks: 22 November 1823
Ship	State	Description
Jane	United Kingdom	The ship was wrecked in Table Bay.

== 23 November ==
List of shipwrecks: 23 November 1823
Ship	State	Description
Phœnix	United States	The ship was abandoned in the Atlantic Ocean. She was on a voyage from Trinidad to Boston, Massachusetts.

== 24 November ==
List of shipwrecks: 24 November 1823
Ship	State	Description
Cleveland	United Kingdom	The ship sprang a leak and was beached in Pernau Bay. She was on a voyage from Bolderāja, Russia to Hull, Yorkshire.
Thomas & Edward	United States	The ship sprang a leak and sank off the coast of Delaware. Her crew were rescued. She was on a voyage from Wilmington, Delaware, to Jamaica.

== 25 November ==
List of shipwrecks: 25 November 1823
Ship	State	Description
Eliza	United Kingdom	The ship was lost in the Magdalen Islands, Lower Canada, British North America with the loss of nine of her crew. She was on a voyage from Quebec City, Lower Canada to Liverpool, Lancashire.
Fanny	United Kingdom	The ship was wrecked near Richibucto, New Brunswick, British North America. She was on a voyage from Chaleur Bay to Liverpool.
Fortitude	United Kingdom	The ship was driven ashore near Cape St. Mary, Portugal. She was on a voyage from Gibraltar to Cork. She was later refloated, and taken in to Faro, where she arrived on 9 December.
General Grant	United Kingdom	The ship ran aground at Miramichi, New Brunswick, British North America.
Hunter	United Kingdom	The ship was driven ashore and wrecked at Charleston, South Carolina, United States. She was on a voyage from Liverpool, Lancashire to Charleston.
Lively	United Kingdom	The ship was driven ashore on an island off Queensferry, Lothian.

== 27 November ==
List of shipwrecks: 27 November 1823
Ship	State	Description
Commerce	(United Kingdom of Great Britain and Ireland) British North America	The ship sprang a leak off Prince Edward Island. Twelve of her eighteen crew were taken off by Bacchus (United Kingdom) before she was driven ashore. She was on a voyage from Quebec City, Lower Canada to London, United Kingdom.
Trent	United Kingdom	The ship was wrecked at sea. Four crew were rescued by Margaret Ann (United Kingdom).
Zeemeeuw	Netherlands	The ship ran aground on the Bondicar Rocks, in the North Sea off Amble, Northumberland, United Kingdom and sank. She was on a voyage from Antwerp to Arbroath, Forfarshire, United Kingdom.

== 28 November ==
List of shipwrecks: 28 November 1823
Ship	State	Description
Belinda	United Kingdom	The ship departed from Newcastle upon Tyne, Northumberland for London. No further trace, presumed foundered in the North Sea with the loss of all hands.

== 29 November ==
List of shipwrecks: 29 November 1823
Ship	State	Description
Duchess of Bedford	United Kingdom	The ship was wrecked on the "Moro", Cuba. All on board were rescued. She was on a voyage from Jamaica to London. Duchess of Bedford was declared a total loss.
Frederick	United Kingdom	The ship was driven ashore on Salt Island Rock, off the coast of Anglesey. Her crew were rescued. She was on a voyage from Liverpool, Lancashire to Lisbon, Portugal.
Friends	United Kingdom	The ship ran aground at Mount Batten, Devon. She was on a voyage from Cork to Plymouth, Devon.
Glenaldale	United Kingdom	The ship was wrecked in the River Shannon. Her crew were rescued. She was on a voyage from Africa to Liverpool.
Icarus	Norway	The ship was driven ashore and wrecked near Gothenburg, Sweden. She was on a voyage from "Trepany" to Norrkøping.
Juno	United Kingdom	The ship was wrecked on the Annat Sand, in the North Sea. Her crew were rescued by the Montrose Lifeboat. She was on a voyage from Saint John, New Brunswick, British North America to Dundee, Forfarshire.
Mary	United Kingdom	The ship was driven ashore at Spurn Point, Yorkshire.
Retrieve	(United Kingdom of Great Britain and Ireland) British North America	The ship departed from Newfoundland for Naples, Kingdom of the Two Sicilies. No further trace, presumed foundered with the loss of all hands.
Susquehanna	United States	The ship was driven ashore in the River Suir.

== 30 November ==
List of shipwrecks: 30 November 1823
Ship	State	Description
Betsey	United Kingdom	The ship was driven ashore and wrecked near Seaford, Sussex with the loss of two lives. She was on a voyage from Richibucto, New Brunswick, British North America to Hull, Yorkshire.
Elizabeth	United Kingdom	The ship was wrecked in the Saint Lawrence River. She was on a voyage from Quebec City, Lower Canada, British North America to London.
Endymion	France	The lugger was driven ashore at Cuckmere Haven, Sussex, United Kingdom with the loss of two of her crew. She was refloated and taken in to Newhaven, Sussex.
Frederick	United Kingdom	The ship was wrecked on the Salt Island Rock, in the Irish Sea. Her crew were rescued. She was on a voyage from Liverpool, Lancashire to Lisbon, Portugal.
Goodintent	United Kingdom	The ship was driven ashore and wrecked on Gramsay, Orkney Islands. Her crew were rescued. She was on a voyage from Wick, Caithness to Drogheda, County Louth.
Maria	United Kingdom	The ship was wrecked on the Hoyle Bank, in Liverpool Bay. her crew were rescued. She was on a voyage from Plymouth, Devon to Liverpool.

== Unknown date ==
List of shipwrecks: Unknown date in November 1823
Ship	State	Description
Alexander	United Kingdom	The ship was driven ashore at the mouth of the Firth of Tay with the loss of four of her crew. She was later refloated and take in to Dundee, Forfarshire where she was declared beyond economic repair.
Ann	United Kingdom	The ship was wrecked on the Butt of Lewis with the loss of two of her crew. She was on a voyage from Saint John, New Brunswick, British North America to Aberdeen.
Ann & Eliza	United Kingdom	The full-rigged ship was in an engagement with an American schooner. Four crew were taken off the wreck by El Felix Emprendendor (Mexico).
Assistance	United Kingdom	The ship was wrecked on the coast of Nova Scotia, British North America between 21 and 25 November. Her crew were rescued.
Bien Aimée	France	The ship was wrecked near Kernic, Finistère. She was on a voyage from Brest to Cherbourg.
Commerce	United Kingdom	The ship was wrecked on the coast of Nova Scotia between 21 and 25 November. Her crew were rescued.
Friends	United Kingdom	The ship foundered in the English Channel 70 nautical miles (130 km) south east of The Lizard, Cornwall before 5 November. Her crew were rescued by John and Sally (United Kingdom). Friends was on a voyage from Youghal, County Cork to Rye, Sussex.
Friends	United Kingdom	The ship was driven ashore and wrecked in the Saint Lawrence River at Father Point, Lower Canada, British North America. She was on a voyage from Quebec City, Lower Canada to Limerick.
George	United Kingdom	The ship was lost near Southport, Lancashire in early November.
George	United Kingdom	The barque was abandoned in the Atlantic Ocean. Her crew were rescued by Sarah Ann (United Kingdom). George was on a voyage from Quebec City, Lower Canada, British North America to Liverpool, Lancashire.
Goodwill	United Kingdom	The ship was driven ashore and wrecked at the entrance of the Wisbech Channel before 3 November.
Hammer	United Kingdom	The brig was wrecked in the Bay of Delette with the loss of a crew member. she was on a voyage from London to Quebec City.
Hannibal	Russia	The ship was lost near Domesnes, Norway. She was on a voyage from Liverpool to Riga.
Henriette	Stettin	The ship was driven ashore on the Île d'Oleron, Finistère.
Hope	United Kingdom	The barque was wrecked at Cape Ray, Newfoundland, British North America with the loss of all hands.
Jong Nicholas	Netherlands	The ship was lost off the Isles of Scilly, United Kingdom. She was on a voyage from Liverpool to Antwerp.
Lion	France	The ship was wrecked near Camaret-sur-Mer, Finistère. She was on a voyage from Bordeaux, Gironde to Rouen, Seine-Inférieure.
Lively	United Kingdom	The ship ran aground on an island in the Firth of Forth off Queensferry, Linlithgowshire.
Maria Catherine	United Kingdom	The ship was wrecked the Saint Lawrence River before 25 November. She was on a voyage from Quebec City, Lower Canada, to Halifax, Nova Scotia, British North America.
Mayflower	United Kingdom	The brig was wrecked at Codroy, Newfoundland, British North America with the loss of all hands.
Nerina	United Kingdom	The ship was wrecked on the coast of Nova Scotia between 21 and 25 November. Her crew were rescued.
Prince Regent	United Kingdom	The ship was driven ashore on Machias Seal Island, in the Bay of Fundy. Her crew were rescued. She was on a voyage from Liverpool to Saint John, New Brunswick, British North America.
Tobias	Hamburg	The ship was driven ashore at "Toulonhery", Finistère, France. She was on a voyage from Hamburg to Porto, Portugal.
Wyton	United Kingdom	The ship was wrecked on the coast of Nova Scotia between 21 and 25 November. Her crew were rescued.
