= Fagioli all'uccelletto =

Italian cannellini bean dish

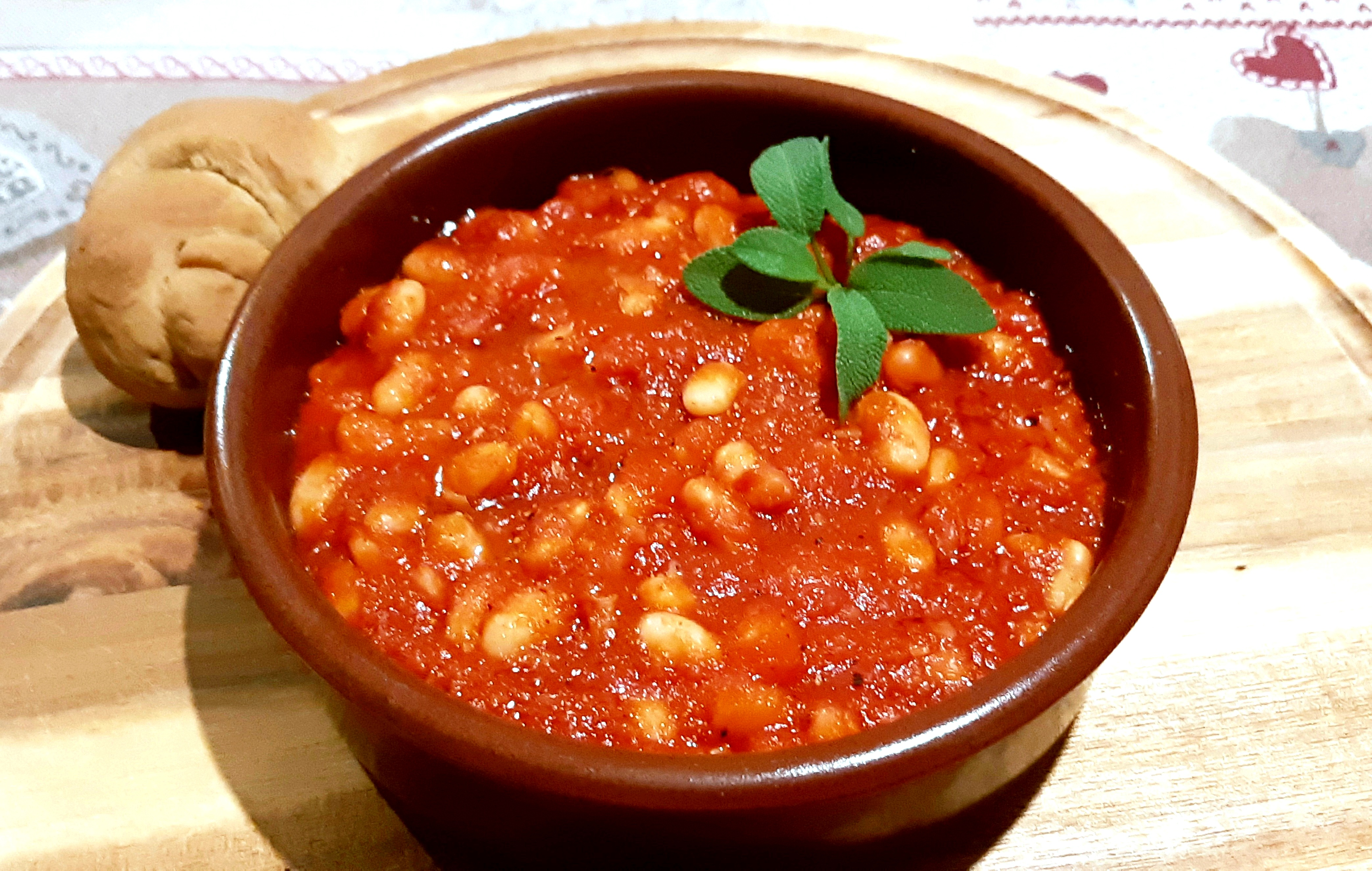
Fagioli all'uccelletto is typically a vegan dish

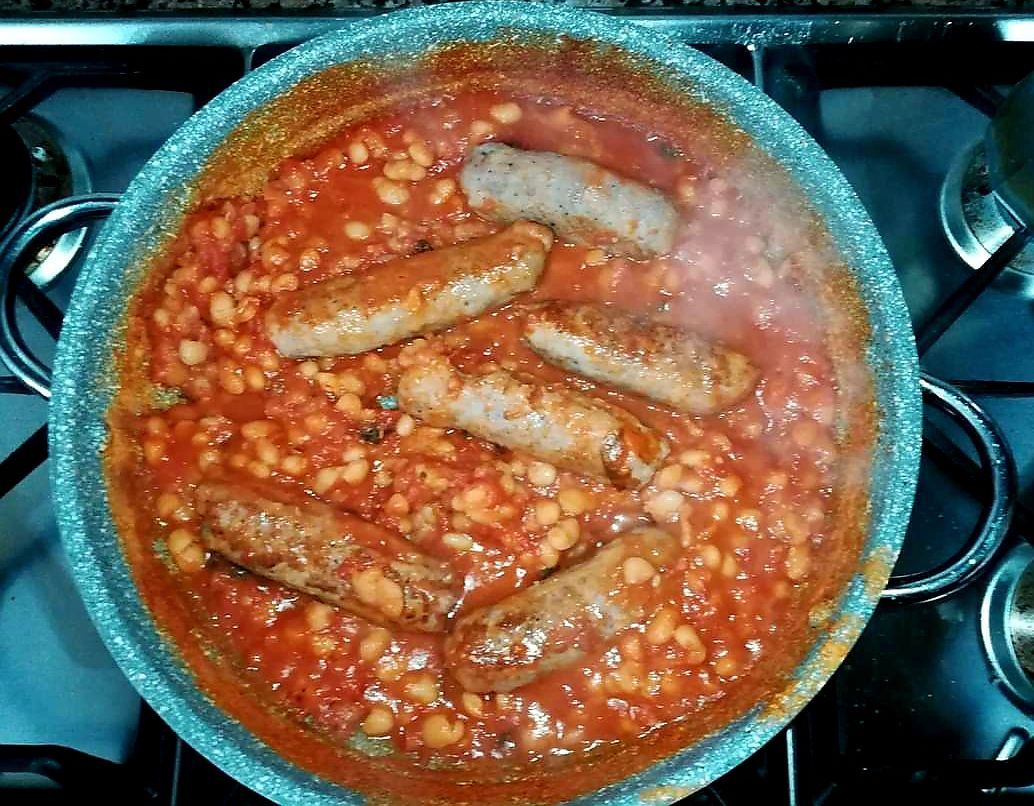
Salsicce con fagioli all'uccelletto is a version that includes meat

Fagioli all'uccelletto (also known as Tuscan tomato beans) is an Italian side dish of cannellini beans (Italian white beans) cooked in tomato sauce with onion, garlic, fresh sage and crushed tomatoes. Basil or rosemary may be included. The standard recipe is vegan and gluten-free, but sausage can be added, making it salsicce con fagioli all'uccelletto. Its name literally means 'beans cooked in the "little bird" style'.

== See also ==
- List of stews
- List of vegetable dishes
