= Tasca (surname) =

Tasca is a surname. Notable people with the surname include:

- Angelo Tasca (1892–1960), Italian politician and historical writer
- Fausto Bellino Tasca (1885–1937), Italian-American artist
- Henry J. Tasca (1912–1979), American diplomat
- Marco Tasca (born 1957), Italian Roman Catholic priest and educator
- Pierantonio Tasca (1858–1934), Italian opera composer
