= Toscano =

Toscano, Tuscano, Toscana, Toscani or Toscanelli may refer to:

== Places ==
- "of Tuscany" or "Tuscan", used as an adjective
- Magliano in Toscana, a comune in Italy
- Toscano (Miami), Florida, United States

== People ==
- Alberto Toscano (born 1977), cultural critic, social theorist, philosopher and translator
- Amy Toscani (born 1963), American sculptor
- Andrea Toscano, Mexican model
- Anton Toscani (1901–1984), Dutch race walker
- Antonino Toscano (1883–1941), Italian admiral during World War II
- Aradia di Toscano, famous witch
- Francis Anthony "Bud" Toscani (1909–1966), American football player
- Carla Toscano de Balbín (born 1977), Spanish politician
- David Toscano (born 1950), American politician
- Domenico Toscano (born 1971), Italian football coach and former midfielder
- Elisabeth Toscani (1761–1799), German actress
- Ellyn Toscano, arts administrator, curator and author
- Francisco Toscano (born 1949), Spanish politician
- Gabriela Toscano (born 1965), Uruguayan-Argentine actress
- Gianluca Toscano (born 1984), Italian footballer
- Giovanni Francesco Toscani (1372–1430), painter
- Jesús Toscano (born 1943), Mexican rower
- Joan Toscano (born 1984), Andorran international footballer
- Joaquín Toscani (born 2002), Argentine field hockey player
- Joseph Toscano (born 1952), Australian anarchist
- Juan Toscano-Anderson (born 1993), Mexican basketball player
- Juan Carlos Toscano Beltran (born 1984), Andorran footballer
- Lucas Toscani (born 1999), Argentine field hockey player
- Marcelo Toscano (born 1985), Brazilian football (soccer) player
- Marco Toscano (born 1997), Italian football player
- Margaret Toscano (born 1956), Indian field hockey player
- Mauricio Toscano (born 1965), Mexican windsurfer
- Milena Toscano (born 1984), Brazilian actress
- Odoardo Toscani (1859–1914), Italian painter
- Oliviero Toscani (1942–2025), Italian photographer
- Paolo dal Pozzo Toscanelli (1397–1482), mathematician
- Peterson Toscano (born 1965), gay activist
- Pia Toscano (born 1988), singer and American Idol contestant
- Piero Toscani (1904–1940), boxer
- Roberto Toscano (born 1943), Italian diplomat
- Salvador Toscano (1872–1947), Mexican film-maker
- Salvatore Toscano (1897–1941), Italian naval officer
- Sarah Toscano (born 2006), Italian singer-songwriter and actress
- Stephan Toscani (born 1967), German politician
- Toscano (wrestler) (born 1973), Mexican professional wrestler

== Science ==
- 96086 Toscanos, an asteroid belt
- Toscana virus, a virus
- Toscanelli (crater), lunar crater

== Sports ==
- Giro di Toscana, annual bicycle race
- Toscana Open Italian Federation Cup, golf tournament

== Music ==
- Cieli di Toscana, a 2001 music album
- Paesaggi toscani, rhapsody for orchestra

== Other uses ==
- Design Toscano, a US-based retailer
- Isabella Toscano, fictional character the US soap opera Days of Our Lives
- Nick Toscanni, fictional character from the 1980s series Dynasty
- Lega Nord Toscana, political party
- MS SNAV Toscana, cruise ferry
- Palais Toskana, palace in Vienna
- Toscano (bread) or Pane sciocco
- Toscano (cigar), Italian cigars
- Toscana (wine)

== See also ==
- Etruscan (disambiguation)
- Tuscan (disambiguation)
- Tuscany (disambiguation)
