= Fausto Bellino Tasca =

Italian-American painter and sculptor

Fausto Bellino Tasca (June 29, 1885 – December 9, 1937) was an Italian-American painter and sculptor active in Southern California.

Born in San Zenone degli Ezzelini, Italy, Tasca emigrated to the US with his wife, the singer Paolina Francesca Tasca, on the SS France from Le Havre, France, arriving on 23 February 1913.

In 1921 he painted murals, with subjects taken from O.E. Monnette's Chronology of California, for the newly built Citizens' Trust and Savings Bank located on 736–740 Hill St., Los Angeles. The subjects included The Triumph of California and an allegorical figure of Industry surrounded by skyscrapers under construction.

Tasca was also renowned for his ecclesiastical decorations, including a remarkable cycle of paintings and windows for San Diego's church of Our Lady of the Rosary, completed in 1926 and restored in 2020. The latter work has been praised for its technical ingenuity, including the innovation of false leading in stained glass windows painted on continuous sheets of glass, and the production of a clay preparatory model for the Crucifixion scene above the altar. Tasca also executed numerous portraits, including a 1937 portrait of Galileo Galilei made for Griffith Observatory. Tasca died on December 9 of that year.
