= Joan Toscano =

Andorran footballer (born 1984)

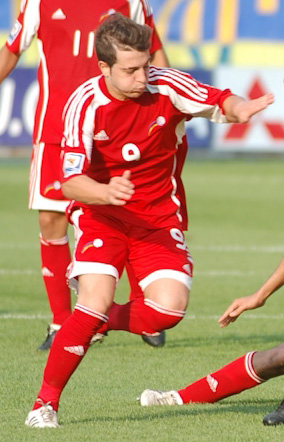
- Toscano playing for Andorra.

Personal information
- Full name: Joan Carles Toscano Beltrán
- Date of birth: 14 August 1984 (age 42)
- Position: Striker

Team information
- Current team: Sant Julià

Senior career*
| Years | Team | Apps | (Gls) |
| 2005–2006 | CE Principat | | |
| 2006–2007 | FC Santa Coloma | | |
| 2007–2008 | CF Gimnástico Alcázar | 26 | (6) |
| 2008–2009 | CD Binéfar | 16 | (0) |
| 2009–2013 | FC Andorra | | |
| 2013–2016 | FC Santa Coloma | 43 | (10) |
| 2016–2017 | FC Ordino | 23 | (6) |
| 2017–2018 | Inter Club d'Escaldes | 8 | (1) |
| 2019– | Sant Julià | | |

International career
| 2006– | Andorra | 21 | (0) |
- * Club domestic league appearances and goals as of 21 March 2019

Joan Carles Toscano Beltrán (born 14 August 1984) is an Andorran international footballer who plays for UE Sant Julià, as a striker.

== Career ==
He has played for CE Principat, FC Santa Coloma, CF Gimnástico Alcázar, CD Binéfar, FC Andorra, FC Ordino and Inter Club d'Escaldes.

In January 2019, Toscano joined UE Sant Julià.

He made his international debut for Andorra in 2006.
