= Panzanella =

Italian bread salad

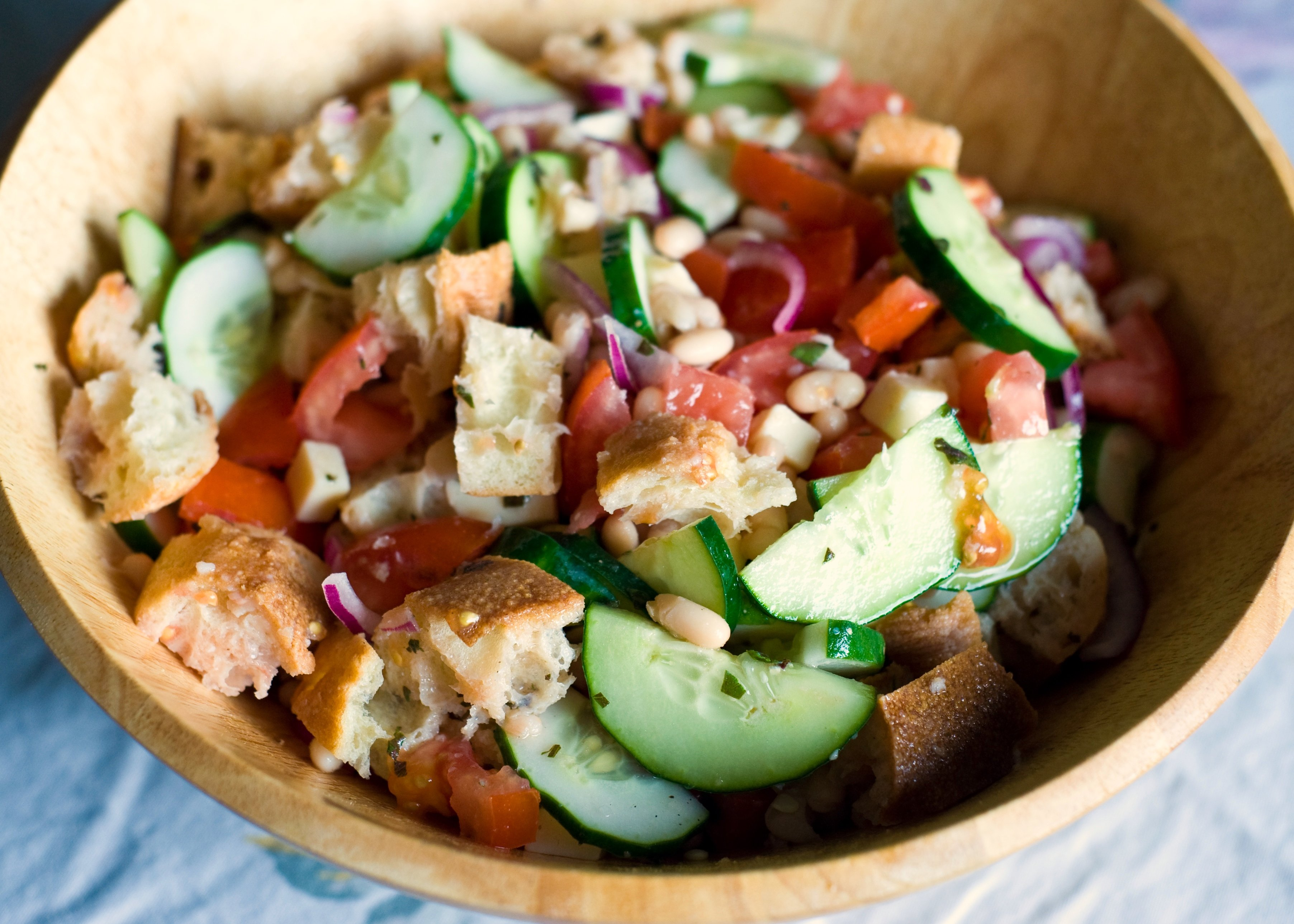
- Alternative names: Panmolle
- Type: Salad
- Place of origin: Italy
- Region or state: Umbria, Tuscany
- Main ingredients: Bread, tomatoes, onions

Panzanella (Italian: [pantsaˈnɛlla]) or panmolle (Italian: [pamˈmɔlle]) is a Tuscan and Umbrian chopped salad of soaked stale bread, onions and tomatoes that is popular in the summer. It often includes cucumbers, sometimes basil and is dressed with olive oil and vinegar.

It is also popular in other parts of central Italy.

== History ==
The 16th-century artist and poet Bronzino sings the praises of onions with oil and vinegar served with toast and, a page later, speaks of a salad of onions, purslane, and cucumbers. This is often interpreted as a description of panzanella.

The name is believed to be a portmanteau of "pane", Italian for 'bread', and "zanella", a deep plate in which it is served.

== Ingredients ==
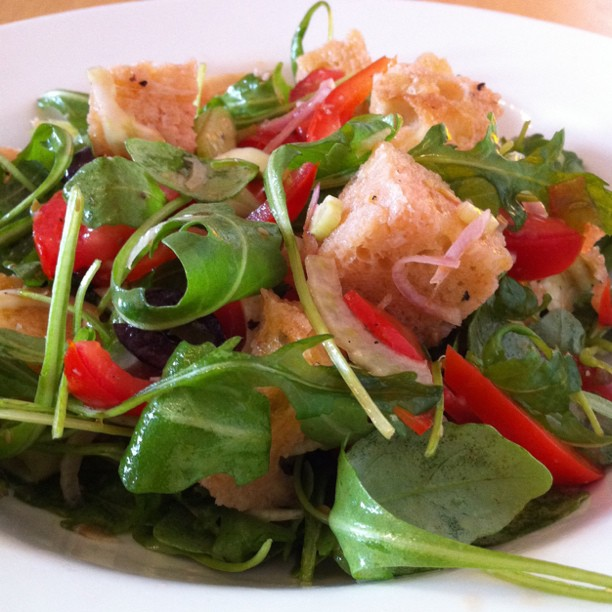
A close-up view of a panzanella

Panzanella was based on onions, not tomatoes, until the 20th century.

Modern panzanella is generally made of stale bread soaked in water and squeezed dry, red onions, tomatoes, olive oil, vinegar, salt, and pepper. Cucumbers and basil are often added.

Optional ingredients include lettuce, olives, mozzarella, white wine, capers, anchovies, celery, carrots, red wine, tuna, parsley, boiled egg, mint, bell peppers, lemon juice, and garlic. These ingredients are sometimes used, but Florentine traditionalists disapprove.

== See also ==
- List of bread dishes
- List of salads
- Fattoush
