= Neccio =

Italian chestnut flour dessert

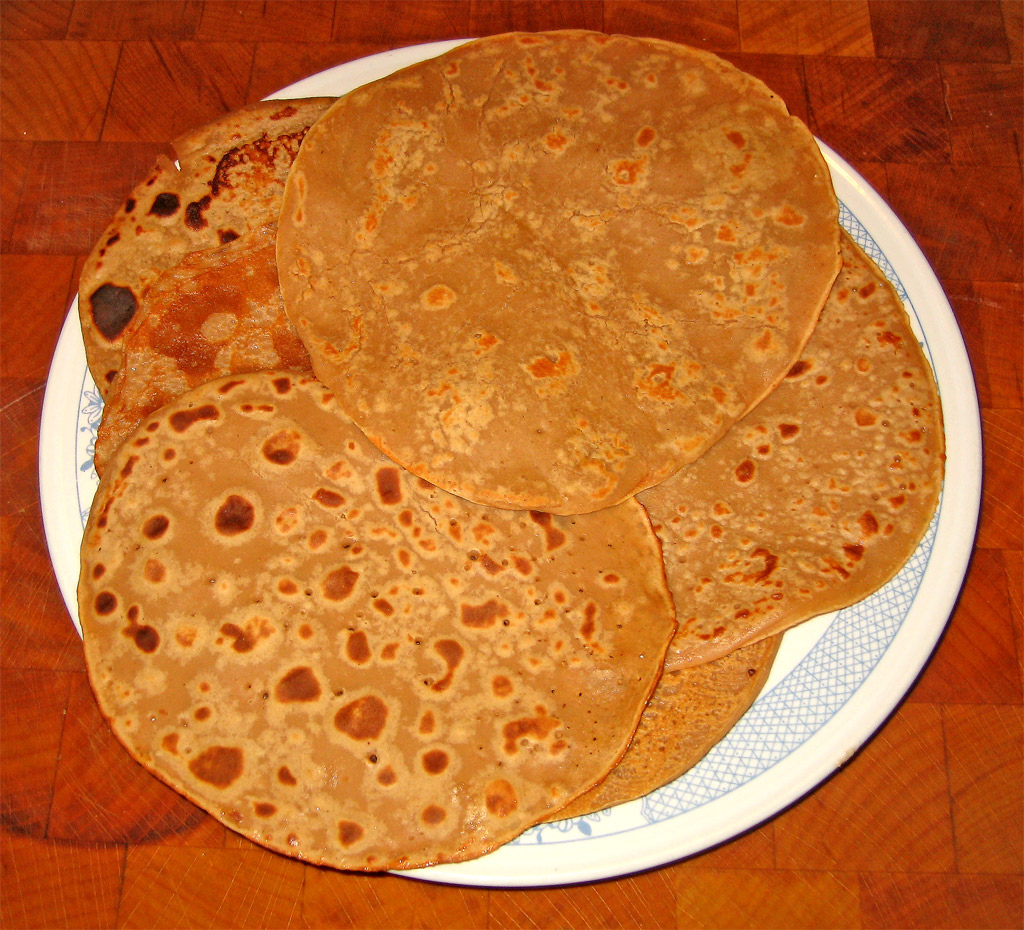
A plate of necci from Tuscany, Italy

Neccio (pl.: necci), also called niccio, ciaccio or cian, is a galette based on chestnut flour, typical of some mountain zones of Tuscany and Emilia, in Italy, and of the island of Corsica, in France.

Today people tend to consider neccio a dessert, but peasants once used to eat it with savory food.

The Italian government has declared neccio a prodotto agroalimentare tradizionale (PAT) of Tuscany.

== Distribution ==
Neccio is typical of Pescia and the Pistoia Mountains, the Lucchesia, the upper Versilia, the Garfagnana, the Frignano and the upper Reno Valley. It is also prepared on the French island of Corsica.

== Denominations ==
In Garfagnana, a region of Tuscany, neccio is a term that designates the chestnut nut and its derivatives.

Other names used for neccio are ciaccio (in Versilia, upper Garfagnana and Frignano), cian (in Lunigiana), caccìn (in the province of La Spezia), panèlla (Sestri Levante and surroundings), castagnaccio or patolla (having a more consistent dough) or nicciu (in Corsica).

== Preparation ==
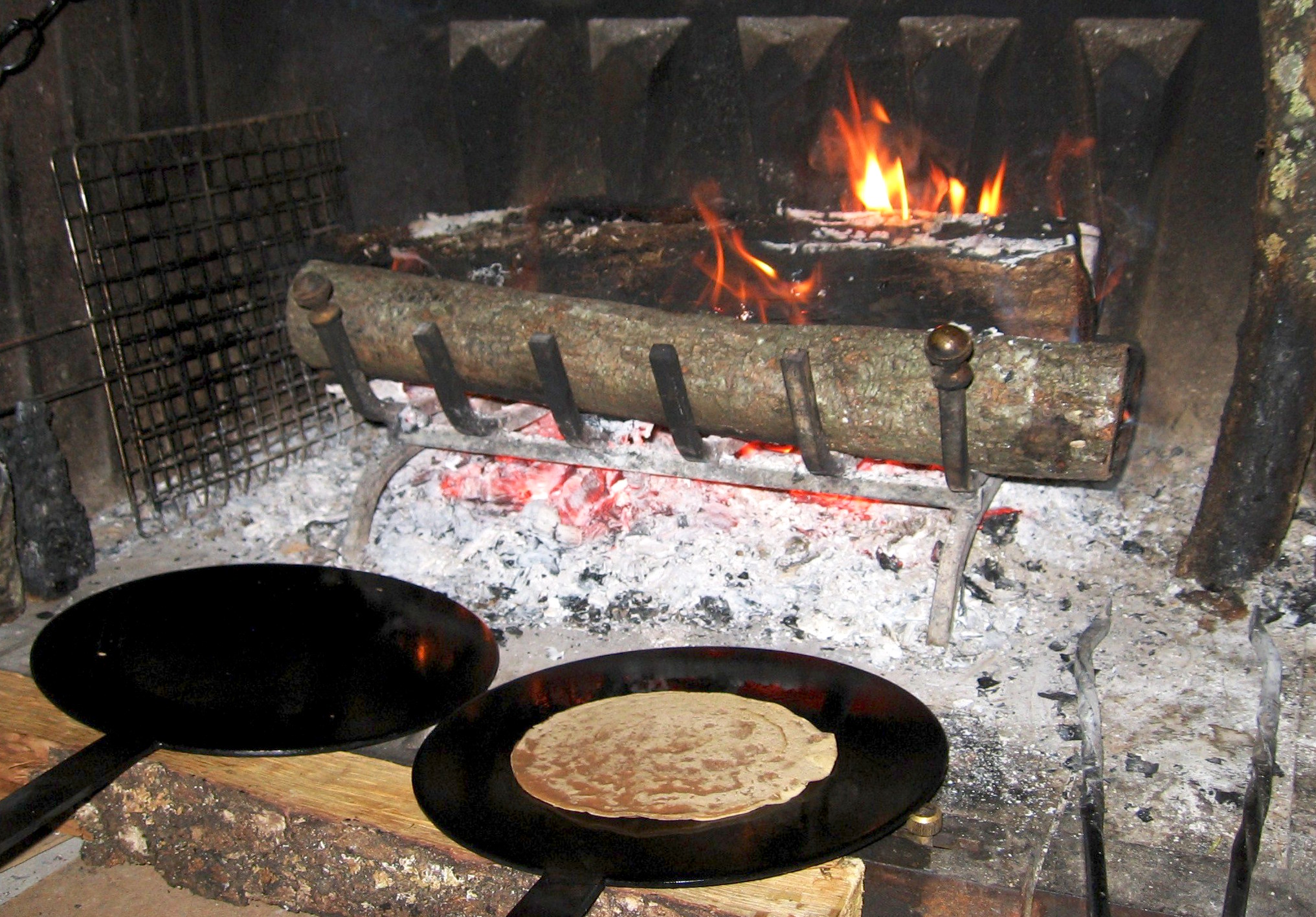
Ferri with cooked neccio

The dough is made with chestnut flour, water, and a little salt. In the Pistoia area, chestnut flour is stored in special chestnut wood containers called bigonce or bugni, or in wooden crates called arconi, from which the flour flakes are taken and strained through a sieve, then chopped by hand. Cooking is difficult and requires both a considerable expertise and either special discs called testi, made of fire-quenched sandstone, pre-heated on the fireplace fire, or iron discs with long handles, named ferri or forme, which must be placed on the surface of the wood stove. Today the testi are more used on the Bolognese side of the Apennines, while in the Pistoia mountains the most-used tools are the ferri.

Cooking with testi is particularly complex. Chestnut leaves are harvested in summer during waning moon and left to soak in lukewarm water. They prevent the necci from sticking to the testo and transmitting their aroma and taste. After the testi have been heated in the fireplace, three to four leaves are laid on a testo, then a ladle of dough is put on them, then three to four more leaves and another hot testo, and so on, until a pile (named "castellina") is formed. The testi's pile is framed by an iron holder tool which stabilizes it. Usually one would pile up one of more rows of testi for 10–20 necci per row, with decreasing diameter from bottom to top. After two to three minutes the necci are ready and the pile is dismounted.

== Stuffed neccio ==
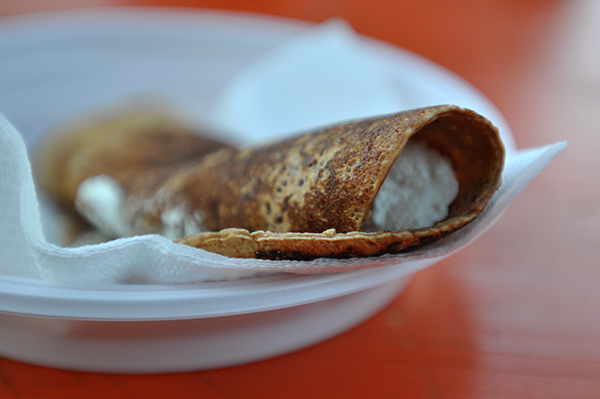
Neccio filled with ricotta cheese

After cooking, the necci are generally stuffed with ricotta cheese (sometimes enriched with dark chocolate chips and/or candied fruit) and rolled up to take the shape of a cannolo.

Neccio can be consumed in these ways:

- a biuscio, a dialectal term that stands for 'without seasoning';
- guercio ('one-eyed' in Italian), with the addition of a thin slice of pancetta before cooking or as a filling. In the second case a few round slices of Tuscan Rigatino (a salumi akin to pancetta) can also be used. They are typical of the Bolognese mountains;
- incicciato ('with meat' in Tuscan dialect), with the addition of salsiccia paste, used as filling or directly in the dough. This version is typical of the Pistoia mountains and in particular of the village of Pracchia;
- con Nutella, stuffed with plenty of chocolate cream. This is a non-traditional version, but appreciated especially among young people;
- con ricotta, with the addition of sheep or cow ricotta cheese. This variant is often used in the area of the Pistoia Apennines;
- con stracchino, with the addition of stracchino cheese, typical of Lunigiana.

== See also ==
Media related to Neccio at Wikimedia Commons

== Sources ==
- Schapira, Christiane (1994). La bonne cuisine corse (in French). Paris: Solar. ISBN 2263001778.
