= Rosticciana =

Italian pork dish

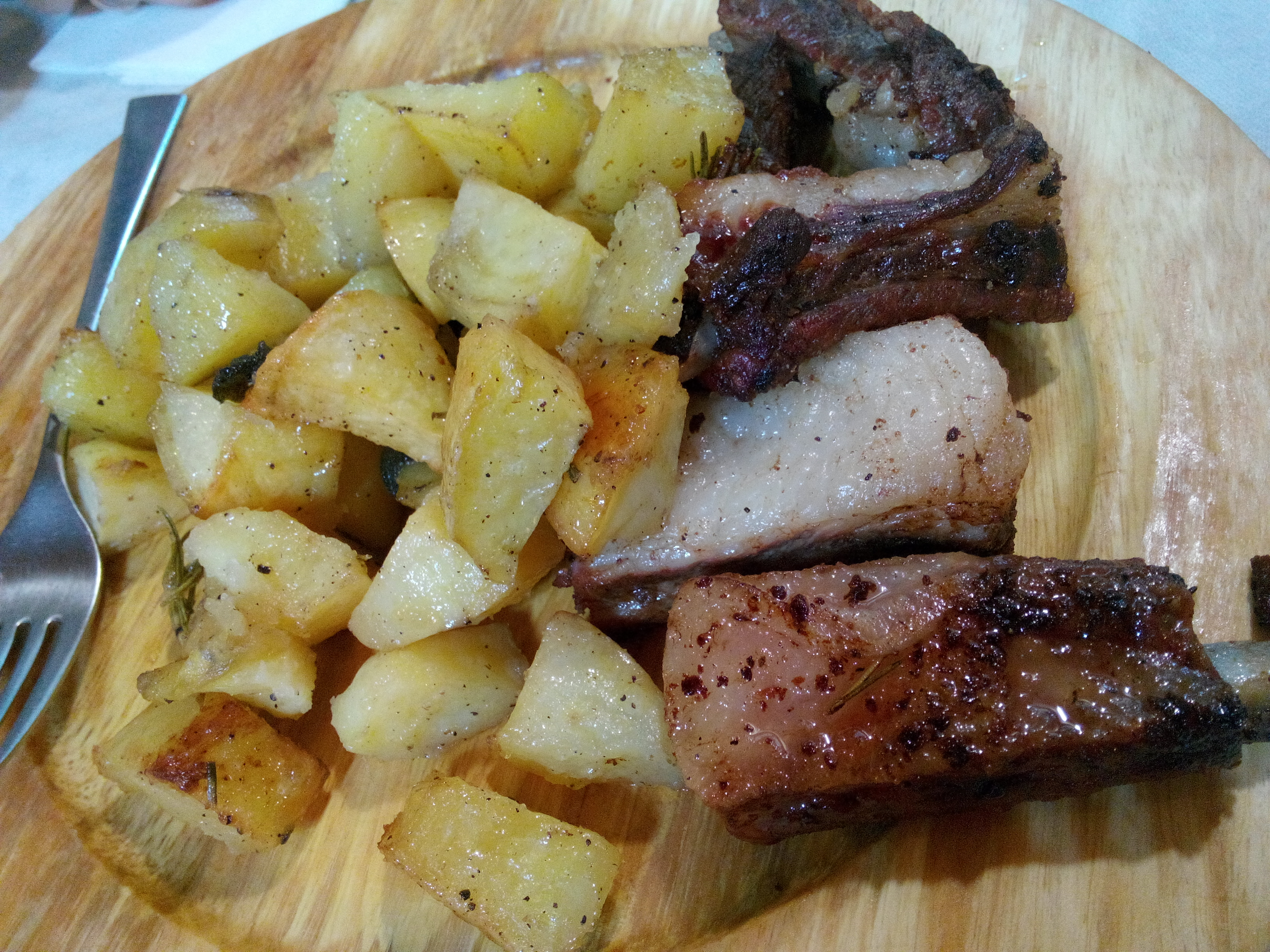
- Rosticciana with potatoes
- Alternative names: Rostinciana
- Course: Secondo (Italian course)
- Place of origin: Italy
- Region or state: Tuscany
- Main ingredients: Pork

Rosticciana (Italian: [rostitˈtʃaːna]) or rostinciana (Italian: [rostinˈtʃaːna]) is an Italian pork dish typical of the Tuscany region, grilled on charcoal or wood fire.

It consists of pork ribs that are seasoned with various spices (sometimes just pepper and salt) and rosemary dipped in vinaigrette before and after cooking.

== See also ==
Media related to Rosticciana at Wikimedia Commons

- List of pork dishes
