= TVR Tuscan =

TVR Tuscan may refer to:

- TVR Tuscan (1967), an English sports car produced from 1967 to 1971
- TVR Tuscan Speed Six, produced from 1999 to 2006
- TVR Tuscan Challenge, a one-make racing series dedicated to the TVR Tuscan Speed Six
