= Tuscany (disambiguation) =

Tuscany is one of the 20 regions of Italy.

Tuscany or Tuscani may also refer to:

== Places ==
- Grand Duchy of Tuscany, the government of the Italian region from 1569 to 1859
- Tuscany, Calgary, Canada
  - Tuscany (C-Train), a light rail station
- Tuscany-Canterbury, Baltimore, United States

== Other uses ==
- Apache Tuscany, a Service-Oriented Architecture (SOA) programming model
- Eccellenza Tuscany, a division of football clubs
- Tuscani, an alternate name for the Hyundai Tiburon
- Tuscany, a luxury diesel motorhome line built by Thor Industries
- Tuscany (album), a 2001 album by the progressive band Renaissance

== See also ==
- Etruscan (disambiguation)
- Kapp Toscana, a headland of Spitsbergen, Svalbard, Norway
- Toscano (disambiguation)
- Tuscan (disambiguation)
