= Pane sciocco =

Italian bread

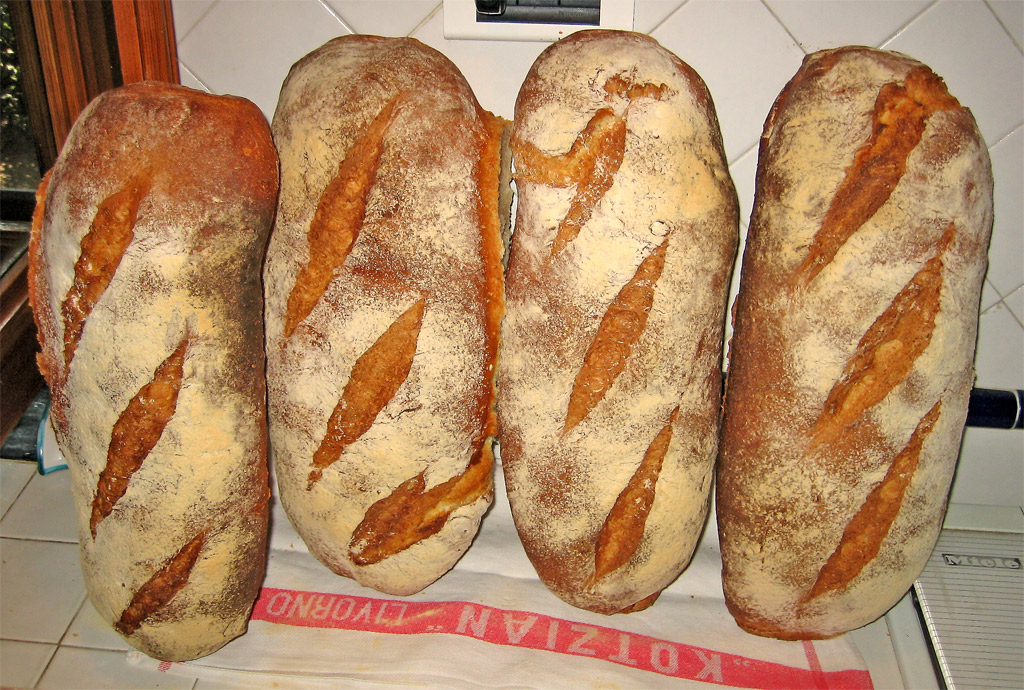
Pane toscano

Pane sciocco (Italian: [ˈpaːne ʃˈʃɔkko]; lit. 'unsalted bread') or pane toscano ('Tuscan bread') outside Tuscany, is a type of bread commonly found in Tuscany, Umbria, and Marche regions of Italy, distinguished from other Italian breads by a lack of salt and slightly acidic crumb. Pane sciocco is often eaten with Tuscan condiments such as pecorino toscano cheese, ham, sausages, and prosciutto.

In Italian, particularly in Tuscany, sciocco means 'unsalted', but is more usually a word for 'foolish, stupid' elsewhere. According to legend, bakers created a saltless bread so they did not have to pay an increased salt tax. Pane sciocco was given Protected designation of origin status in March 2016 in European directive 2016/58.

== See also ==
Media related to Tuscan bread at Wikimedia Commons
