= HMS Tuscan =

Three ships of the Royal Navy have been named HMS Tuscan.

- HMS Tuscan, was the French 16-gun Friedland-class brig Ronco, launched in April 1808, captured in May 1808, renamed Tuscan, and sold in 1818. She became a whaler, making six whaling voyages before being condemned during her seventh in 1840 as no longer seaworthy.
- HMS Tuscan (1919), S-class destroyer launched in March 1919 and scrapped in 1932
- HMS Tuscan (R56), T-class destroyer launched in May 1942, later converted to a Type 16 frigate and scrapped in 1966
