= Tuscan (1793 ship) =

History

Great Britain
- Name: Tuscan
- Owner: Donoghue, or Donoghue
- Builder: Hull
- Launched: 1793
- Captured: 1798

United Kingdom
- Name: Tuscan
- Owner: Charlton
- Acquired: 1805
- Fate: Wrecked November 1823

General characteristics
- Tons burthen: 261, or 262, or 276(bm)
- Propulsion: Sail
- Armament: 1798:4 × 4-pounder guns + 4 × 3-pounder guns; 1805:6 × 18-pounder carronades; 1810:6 × 18-pounder carronades

Tuscan was built at Hull in 1793. She reportedly made one voyage for the British East India Company (EIC). A French privateer captured her in 1798, but she returned to British hands c.1805. She was wrecked at Memel in November 1823.

== Career ==
Between 3 August 1795 and 19 December 1797, while under the command of Captain William Owens, she made one voyage for the EIC. (Note: The British Library has no record of the voyage. However, Hardy does list her among non-Indiamen that carried cargoes on behalf of the EIC. He shows her as having returned on 22 December 1797 from Bengal.)

Tuscan only appeared in Lloyd's Register (LR) in 1798, at which time her trade is London — Gibraltar; her master is still Owens. Lloyd's List of 25 December 1798 reported that a French privateer had captured Tuscan, Owens, master, in the West Indies as Tuscan was on her way from Demerara to London.

In a process that is still unclear, Tuscan returned to British ownership. She reappeared in Lloyd's Register in 1805.

Year	Master	Owner	Trade
1805	Charlton	Charlton	Plymouth transport
1810	Charlton	Captain & Company	Whitby-Shields
1815	J. Harland	Charlton	Newcastle—London; London—Monserrat
1820	Thompson	Charlton	London—Prince Edward Island
1824	J. Dale	Charlton	Exmouth-Gothenburg
1825	Dale	Charlton	Falmouth—New Brunswick

== Fate ==
Although the Register of Shipping carried Tuscan in 1825, her last entry in Lloyd's Register was in 1824.

Lloyd's List reported from Memel that Tuscan, Dale, master, had sailed from there on 16 November 1823, bound for London. However, she had put back having lost an anchor a cable. During the night of the 17th, a gale drove her onshore to the north of the harbour. Her crew was saved and it was believed that her cargo could be saved, but she was probably wrecked. A further report dated "Memel 29 November" stated that most of Tuscan's materials had been saved.
