= Castagnaccio =

Italian chestnut flour cake

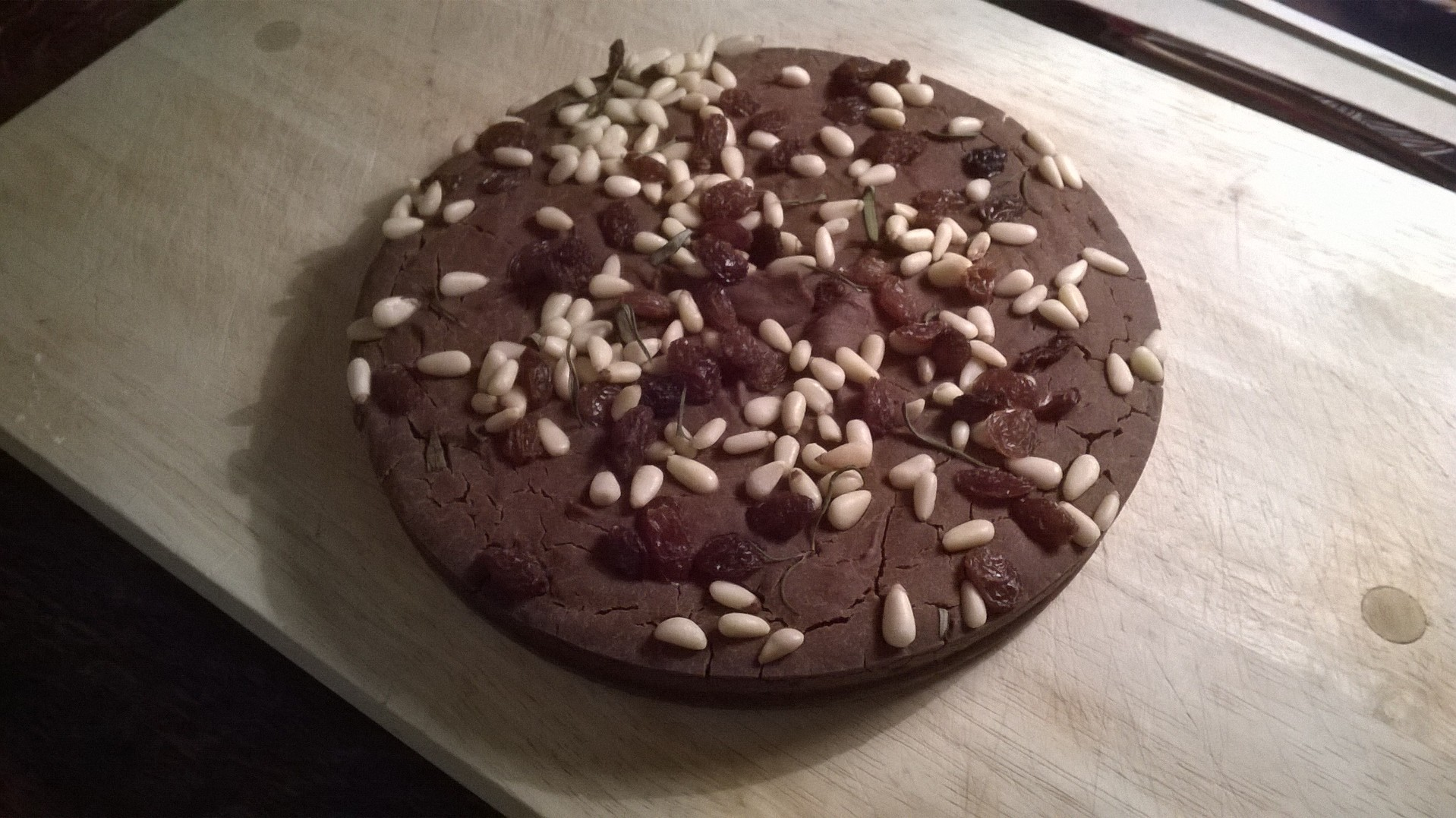
- Type: Cake
- Place of origin: Italy
- Main ingredients: Chestnut flour
- Ingredients generally used: Olive oil, pine nuts, raisins

Castagnaccio is an Italian chestnut flour cake. It is a typically autumnal dessert, made by a dough of chestnut, water, olive oil, pine nuts, and raisins, and baked. Local variations may include other ingredients, such as rosemary, orange rind, fennel seeds, and other dried fruit. There are also variations on the thickness of the cake, and specific names are sometimes used locally to refer to such variations. For example, in Livorno, a castagnaccio 3 centimeters thick is called toppone.

Castagnaccio is a typical rural dessert of the Apennine area, where chestnuts used to be a staple food of country communities. During the economic growth following World War II it lost its role as the main sweet in these areas, and is now prepared and sold mostly as an autumn delicacy.

The Commentario delle più notabili et mostruose cose d'Italia e di altri luoghi by Ortensio Lando (1553) credits some "Pilade from Lucca" as the inventor of the castagnaccio (fu il primo che facesse castagnazzi e di questo ne riportò loda).

== See also ==
- List of Italian desserts and pastries
- List of cakes
