= Tyrrhenia (disambiguation) =

Tyrrhenia may refer to:

- Tyrrhenia aka Etruria or Tyrsenia, the land of the Etruscans, a pre-Indo-European-speaking people on the Italic peninsula, that was subsumed into the growing Roman Republic.
  - An era of Etruria, see List of Iron Age states
- Tyrrhenian Sea, part of the Mediterranean, between the Italian mainland, Sicily, Corsica, and Sardinia
- SS Tyrrhenia (1920-1940), British oceanliner
- A subgenus of Nebria containing:
  - Nebria apuana
  - Nebria eugeniae
  - Nebria fulviventris
  - Nebria lareyniei
  - Nebria orsinii
  - Nebria reymondi
  - Nebria rubicunda rubicunda
  - Nebria testacea
  - Nebria uluderensis
  - Nebria vanvolxemi

== See also ==
- Tyrrhenian (disambiguation)
- Tyrsenian (disambiguation) aka Tyrrhenian
- Etruscan (disambiguation) aka Tyrrhenian
- Etrurian (disambiguation) aka Tyrrhenian
- Etruria (disambiguation) aka Tyrrhenia
