= Etruria (disambiguation) =

Etruria, a.k.a. Tyrrhenia or Tyrsenia, is the land of the Etruscans, a pre-Indo-European people on the Italic peninsula, that was subsumed into the growing Roman Republic.

Etruria may also refer to:

- Etruscan civilization also referred to as Etruria
- Kingdom of Etruria (1801-1807), a former kingdom located in what is now Tuscany.
  - King of Etruria, elliptically known as Etruria
- Etruria, Staffordshire, England, UK; a suburb of Stoke-on-Trent
  - Etruria Works, Etruria, Staffordshire, England, UK; a ceramics factory that gave its name to the settlement that formed around it in Staffordshire
  - Etruria Hall, Etruria, Staffordshire, England, UK; a listed building
  - Etruria railway station (1848-2005), Etruria, Staffordshire, England, UK; a former rail station
- Nuova Banca Etruria (New Bank of Etruria), a former Italian bank
- RMS Etruria (1884-1908), a trans-Atlantic oceanliner of the Cunard Line
- SS Etruria (1902-1905), a Great Lakes laker freighter
- Italian cruiser Etruria (1889-1918), a protected cruiser of the Regia Marina
- HMT Etruria; a British Royal Navy trawler, see List of requisitioned trawlers of the Royal Navy (WWII)
- Baronet of Etruria, see Wedgwood baronets

== See also ==
- Etrurian (disambiguation)
- Etruscan (disambiguation) a.k.a. Etrurian
- Tyrsenian (disambiguation) a.k.a. Etrurian
- Tyrrhenian (disambiguation) a.k.a. Etrurian
- Tyrrhenia (disambiguation) a.k.a. Etruria
