= Ruckman =

Ruckman may refer to:

- Ruckman, West Virginia
- Ruckman (Australian rules football)
- Fort Ruckman, a U.S. Coast Artillery fort located in Nahant, Massachusetts

== People ==
- Ivy Ruckman (1931–2021), award-winning author
- Peter Ruckman (1921–2016), Baptist minister and King James Only advocate
- John Wilson Ruckman (1858–1921), American general
- Johan Gustaf Ruckman (1780–1862), Swedish engraver
