= Etrurian =

Etrurian may refer to:

- The Etrurian language, an extinct language in ancient Italy
- Something derived from or related to Etrurian civilization
  - Etrurian architecture
  - Etrurian art
  - Etrurian cities
  - Etrurian coins
  - Etrurian history
  - Etrurian mythology
  - Etrurian numerals
  - Etrurian origins
  - Etrurian society
  - Etrurian terracotta warriors
  - Etrurian military history

== See also ==
- Etruria (disambiguation)
- Etruscan (disambiguation) aka Etrurian
- Tyrsenian (disambiguation) aka Etrurian
- Tyrrhenian (disambiguation) aka Etrurian
