= Nebria rubicunda =

Scientific classification
- Domain: Eukaryota
- Kingdom: Animalia
- Phylum: Arthropoda
- Class: Insecta
- Order: Coleoptera
- Suborder: Adephaga
- Family: Carabidae
- Genus: Nebria
- Species: N. rubicunda

Binomial name
- Nebria rubicunda Quensel, 1806

Species of beetle

Nebria rubicunda is a species of brown coloured ground beetle in the Nebriinae subfamily that can be found in Algeria, Morocco, Tunisia and in Spain. The species are 11 millimetres (0.43 in) in length.

== Subspecies ==
- Nebria rubicunda maroccan Antoine, 1925
- Nebria rubicunda rubicunda Quensel, 1806
