= Nebria rubicunda rubicunda =

Scientific classification
- Domain: Eukaryota
- Kingdom: Animalia
- Phylum: Arthropoda
- Class: Insecta
- Order: Coleoptera
- Suborder: Adephaga
- Family: Carabidae
- Genus: Nebria
- Species: N. rubicunda
- Subspecies: N. r. rubicunda

Trinomial name
- Nebria rubicunda rubicunda Quensel, 1806

Subspecies of beetle

Nebria rubicunda rubicunda is a subspecies of brown coloured ground beetle in the Nebriinae subfamily that can be found in Algeria, Morocco, Tunisia, and Spain. The species are 11 millimetres (0.43 in) in length.
