= Tyrrhenian =

Tyrrhenian may refer to the:

- Tyrrhenian Stage, a faunal stage from 0.26 to 0.01143 million years ago
- Tyrrhenians, an ancient ethnonym associated with the Etruscans
- Tyrrhenian Sea
- Tyrrhenian Basin
- Tyrrhenian languages

== See also ==
- Tyrrhenia (disambiguation)
- Etruscan (disambiguation) aka Tyrrhenian
- Etrurian (disambiguation) aka Tyrrhenian
- Tyrsenian (disambiguation) aka Tyrrhenian
