= Johan Wilhelm Palmstruch =

Swedish soldier, artist, and naturalist

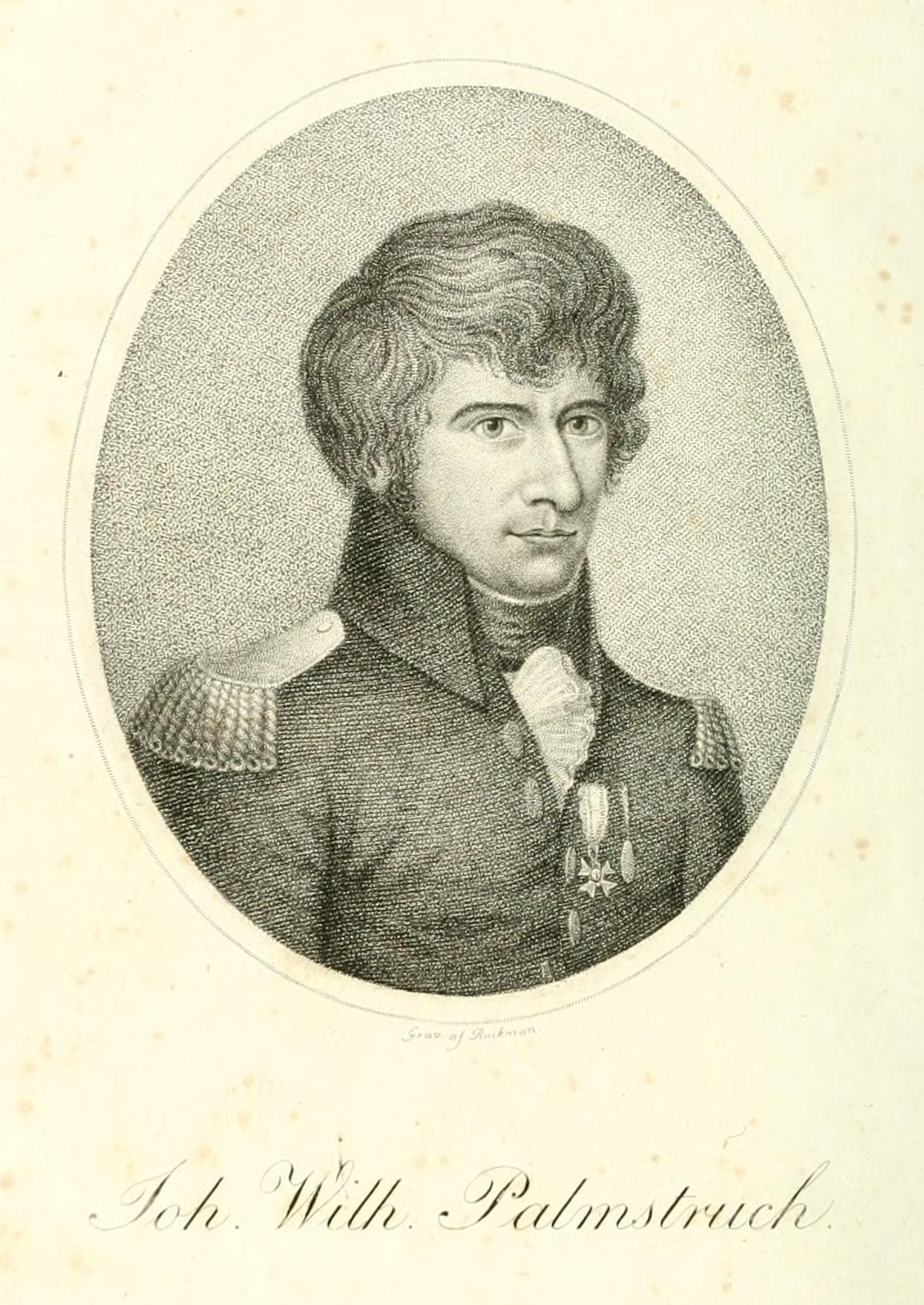
Johan Wilhelm Palmstruch

Johan Wilhelm Palmstruch (3 March 1770 – 30 August 1811) was a Swedish soldier, artist, copperplate engraver, and naturalist. He contributed to the illustrated botanical work Svensk Botanik and the plant genus Palmstruckia is named in his honour.

== Life and work ==
Palmstruch was born in Stockholm and died at Vänersborg in Älvsborg County, Sweden. His father Urban Reinhold was a major and he too joined the military service in 1786. He saw action in 1788-90 and in 1791 he went to Morocco under Colonel Rosenstein. He became a cavalry captain in 1793 and from 1797 he served as an instructor at the Fribyggarordens Lyceum, working on agriculture. He was compared to English naturalist, James Sowerby (1757–1822). In 1802 Carl Venus and Palmstruch were put in charge of publishing a book on the medical and economically important plants with about 500 species illustrated with copperplate engravings. The text was to be written by Conrad Quensel, Olof Swartz and others. It was supported by the Royal Swedish Academy of Sciences. He contributed in the publication of two vast volumes of work of natural history; Svensk Botanik which was first published in 1802 and Svensk Zoologi first published in 1806. The work was reused to produce lithographs which were hand colored for the Bilder ur Nordens flora (1901–05) by Carl Lindman.

== See also ==
- Conrad Quensel
- Johan Gustaf Ruckman
- Olof Swartz
- Gustaf Johan Billberg
