= Johan Gustaf Ruckman =

Swedish artist (1780–1862)

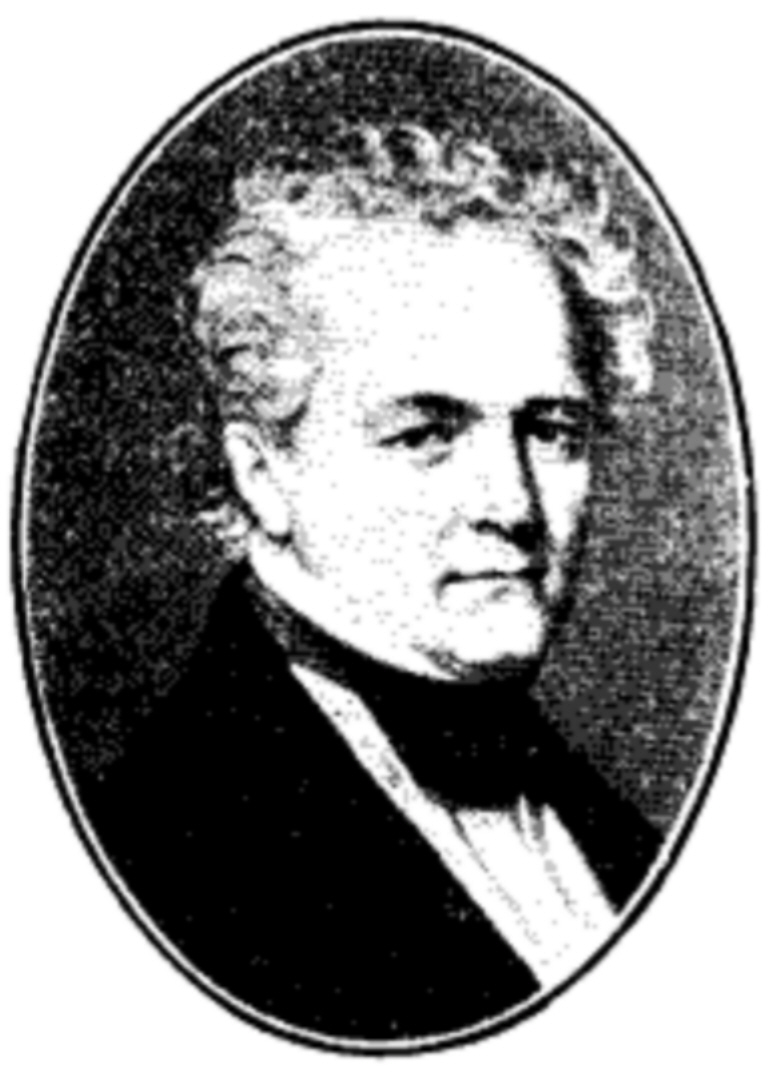
Oval portrait of Johan Gustaf Ruckman from the Nordisk familjebok

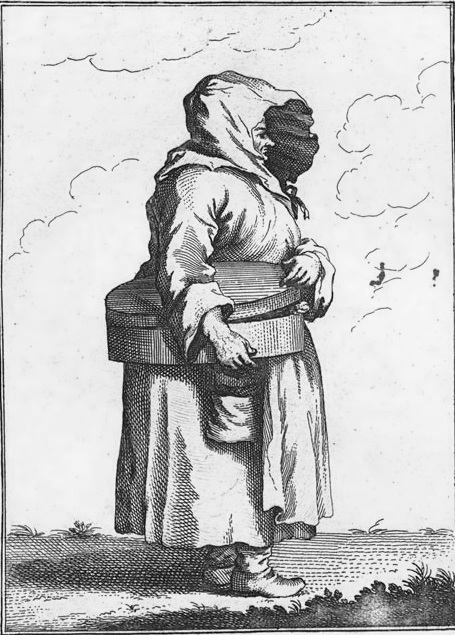
Bakelse-Jeanna in an 1820 book illustration. Copper plate engraving by Ruckman

Johan Gustaf Ruckman (December 12, 1780 – January 20, 1862) was a Swedish engraver.

== Biography ==
Ruckman was born in Stockholm in 1780.

In 1805, being a pupil of Johan Wilhelm Palmstruch, Ruckman helped with the preparation of tables in Palmstruch's work Svensk botanik ("Swedish Botany"). From the fifth volume of this series, he designed several pages independently. At the same time he helped Palmstruch and Conrad Quensel with the preparation of Svensk zoologi ("Swedish Zoology"). From the seventh volume of Svensk Botanik (1812) until the completion of the eleventh volume (1838), Ruckman personally engraved all the printing plates. Ruckman found time to further develop his artistry and designed a number of portraits. He also illustrated fashion journals, calendars, and children's books; writings of the Swedish Academy of Sciences and other scientific institutions; and about 100 map sheets. Ruckman is well represented in the collection of engravings of the Swedish National Museum.

== Selected works ==
=== Portraits ===
- Franzén
- K.P. Hagberg
- A. Hylander
- Ph. von Mecklenburg
- Tegnér
- J. Tengström
- Thunberg
- Wallin

=== Books and data tables ===
- Desseins et croquis des plus célèbres maîtres (1 Heft, 1820)
- Scener ur Fredmans epistlar och sånger (1827–28), drawings by E. Chiewitz
- Archiv för nyare resor (1810–11)
- Jorden och dess invånare af Zimmermann (1813–39)
