= Nebria apuana =

Scientific classification
- Kingdom: Animalia
- Phylum: Arthropoda
- Clade: Pancrustacea
- Class: Insecta
- Order: Coleoptera
- Suborder: Adephaga
- Family: Carabidae
- Genus: Nebria
- Species: N. apuana

Binomial name
- Nebria apuana Busi & Rivalta, 1980

Species of beetle

Nebria apuana is a species of ground beetle in the Nebriinae subfamily that is endemic to Italy.
