= Etruscan origins =

Theories on the ancient Italian civilization

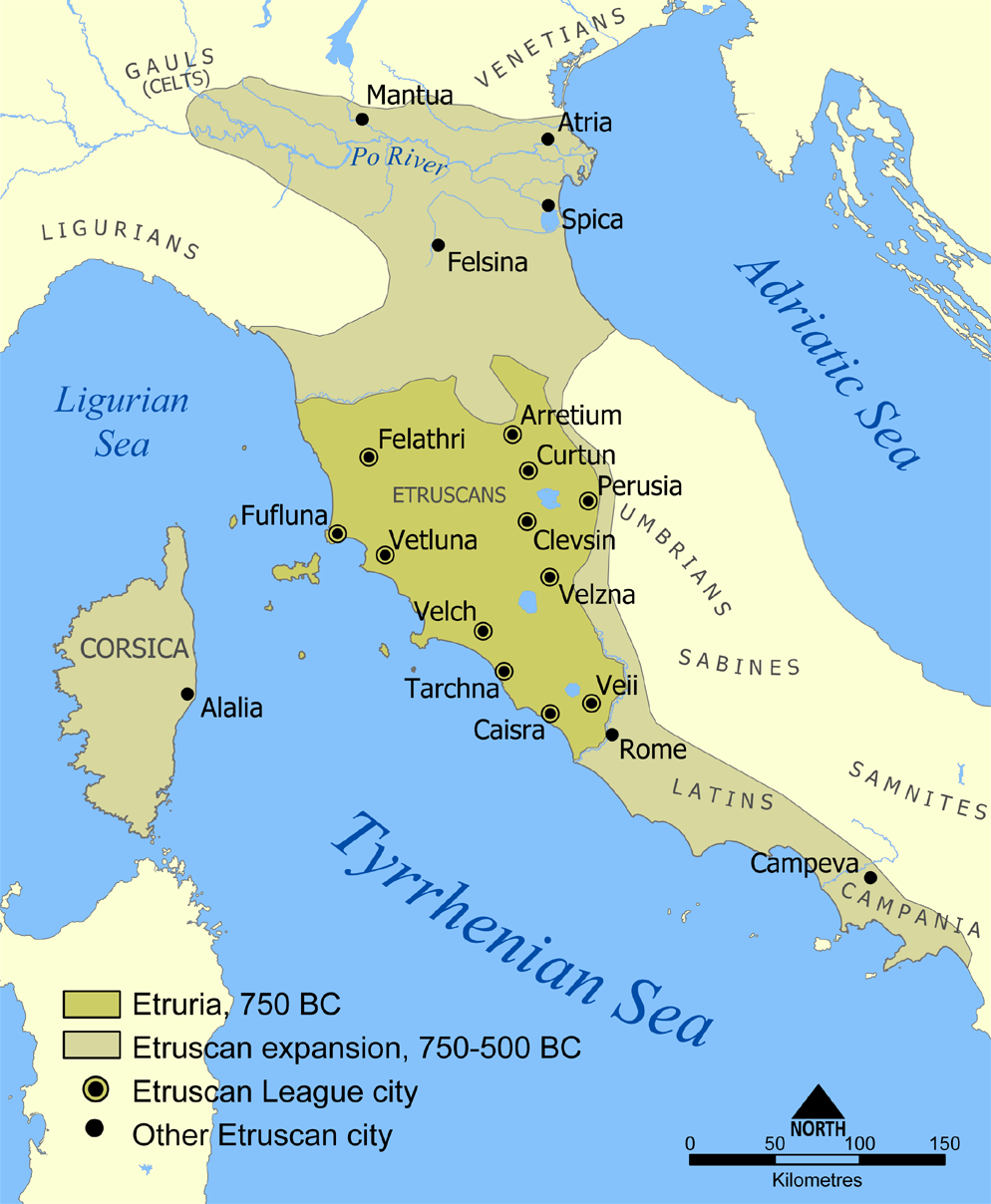
A map showing the extent of Etruria and the Etruscan civilization. The map includes the 12 cities of the Etruscan League and notable cities founded by the Etruscans.

In classical antiquity, several competing theories were proposed concerning the origins of the Etruscans, beginning in the 5th century BC, when Etruscan civilization had already been established for several centuries in its historical territories. These accounts can be broadly divided into four main hypotheses.

The first is autochthonous development, according to which the Etruscans originated in Italy and developed locally from earlier populations. The Greek historian Dionysius of Halicarnassus supported the indigenous hypothesis, describing the Etruscans as an ancient population native to Etruria rather than as immigrants from abroad.

The second is migration from Anatolia, as proposed by the Greek historian Herodotus, who described the Etruscans as descendants of immigrants from Lydia in western Anatolia. According to his account, a group of Lydians migrated to Italy under the leadership of Tyrrhenus, following a period of famine in their homeland.

The third hypothesis, reported by Livy and Pliny the Elder, associates the Etruscans with the Rhaetian people of the Alps. According to this tradition, the Rhaetians were descendants of Etruscans who had migrated northwards into the Alpine regions, particularly following the Gallic invasions of northern Italy.

The fourth account concerns the relationship between the Tyrrhenians and the Pelasgians, and was proposed by the Greek historian Hellanicus of Lesbos and later given a contrasting interpretation by Myrsilus of Lesbos. Hellanicus maintained that the Tyrrhenians were originally Pelasgians from Thessaly, Greece, who were driven from their homeland and migrated to Italy, entering through the northern Adriatic Sea before settling in the territory subsequently known as Tyrrhenia. Myrsilus, as quoted by Dionysius of Halicarnassus, proposed the reverse account: the Tyrrhenians were originally inhabitants of Italy who, after leaving their homeland and migrating eastwards, acquired the designation Pelargoi (later associated with the Pelasgians) during their wanderings through Greece and other regions.

The first Greek author to mention the Etruscans, whom the Ancient Greeks called Tyrrhenians, was the 8th-century BC poet Hesiod, in his work, the Theogony. He mentioned them as residing in central Italy alongside the Latins. The 7th-century BC Homeric Hymn to Dionysus referred to them as pirates. Unlike later Greek authors, such as Herodotus and Hellanicus, these earlier Greek authors did not suggest that Etruscans had migrated to Italy from elsewhere.

According to prehistoric and protohistoric archaeologists, anthropologists, etruscologists, geneticists and linguists, all the evidence gathered so far points to an autochthonous origin of the Etruscans. Moreover, there is no archaeological evidence for a migration of the Lydians or the Pelasgians into Etruria. It was only in the 5th century BC, when the Etruscan civilization had been established for several centuries, that Greek writers started associating the name "Tyrrhenians" with the "Pelasgians" or the "Lydians". There is consensus among modern scholars that these Greek tales are not based on real events. The earliest evidence of a culture that is identifiably Etruscan dates from about 900 BC: this is the period of the Iron Age Villanovan culture, considered to be the earliest phase of Etruscan civilization, which itself developed from the previous late Bronze Age Proto-Villanovan culture in the same region, part of the central European Urnfield culture system.

Helmut Rix's classification of the Etruscan language within the Tyrsenian family—alongside Raetic and Lemnian—has gained support from comparative linguistics. While the discovery of Lemnian inscriptions in 1885 once suggested a possible east-to-west migration, more recent linguistic and archaeological assessments argue instead for a west-to-east diffusion. Scholars such as Wallace (2010), Simon (2021), and Chiai (2024) interpret the Lemnian language as a derivative or dialect of Etruscan introduced to the island through maritime contact, possibly via an Etruscan trading enclave, rather than evidence of a common origin or population movement, as argued previously by Gras, De Simone and Drews.

A mtDNA study published in 2013 concluded that the Etruscans' mtDNA appears very similar to that of the Neolithic population from Central Europe and to other Tuscan populations. This coincides with the Rhaetic language, which was spoken south and north of the Alps in the area of the Urnfield culture of Central Europe. The Villanovan culture, the early period of the Etruscan civilization, derives from the Proto-Villanovan culture that branched from the Urnfield culture around 1200 BC. An autochthonous population that diverged genetically was previously suggested as a possibility by Cavalli-Sforza.

A 2019 genetic study published in the journal Science analyzed the autosomal DNA of 11 Iron Age samples from the areas around Rome, concluding that Etruscans (900-600 BC) and the Latins (900-200 BC) from Latium vetus were genetically similar, and Etruscans also had Steppe-related ancestry despite speaking a pre-Indo-European language.

A 2021 genetic study published in the journal Science Advances analyzed the autosomal DNA of 48 individuals from Tuscany and Lazio dating from 800 to 1 BCE. According to the authors, the Etruscan individuals and the previously analyzed Iron Age Latins possessed comparable levels of Western Steppe Herders ancestry, which is derived from Yamnaya pastoralists who expanded westwards from the Pontic–Caspian steppe during the late Neolithic and the early Bronze Age. The study found no evidence of recent admixture from Anatolia or the Eastern Mediterranean among the principal Etruscan genetic cluster, concluding that the Etruscans were autochthonous and they had a genetic profile similar to their Latin neighbors. Overall, approximately 75% of the Etruscan samples belonged to Y-haplogroup R1b (R1b M269), predominantly represented by R1b-P312 and its derived R1b-L2 lineage, a downstream subclade of R1b-U152, "that diffused across Europe alongside steppe-related ancestry in association with the Bell Beaker complex", while the most common mitochondrial DNA haplogroup among the Etruscans was H.

== Historical claims of autochthonous (indigenous) origin ==
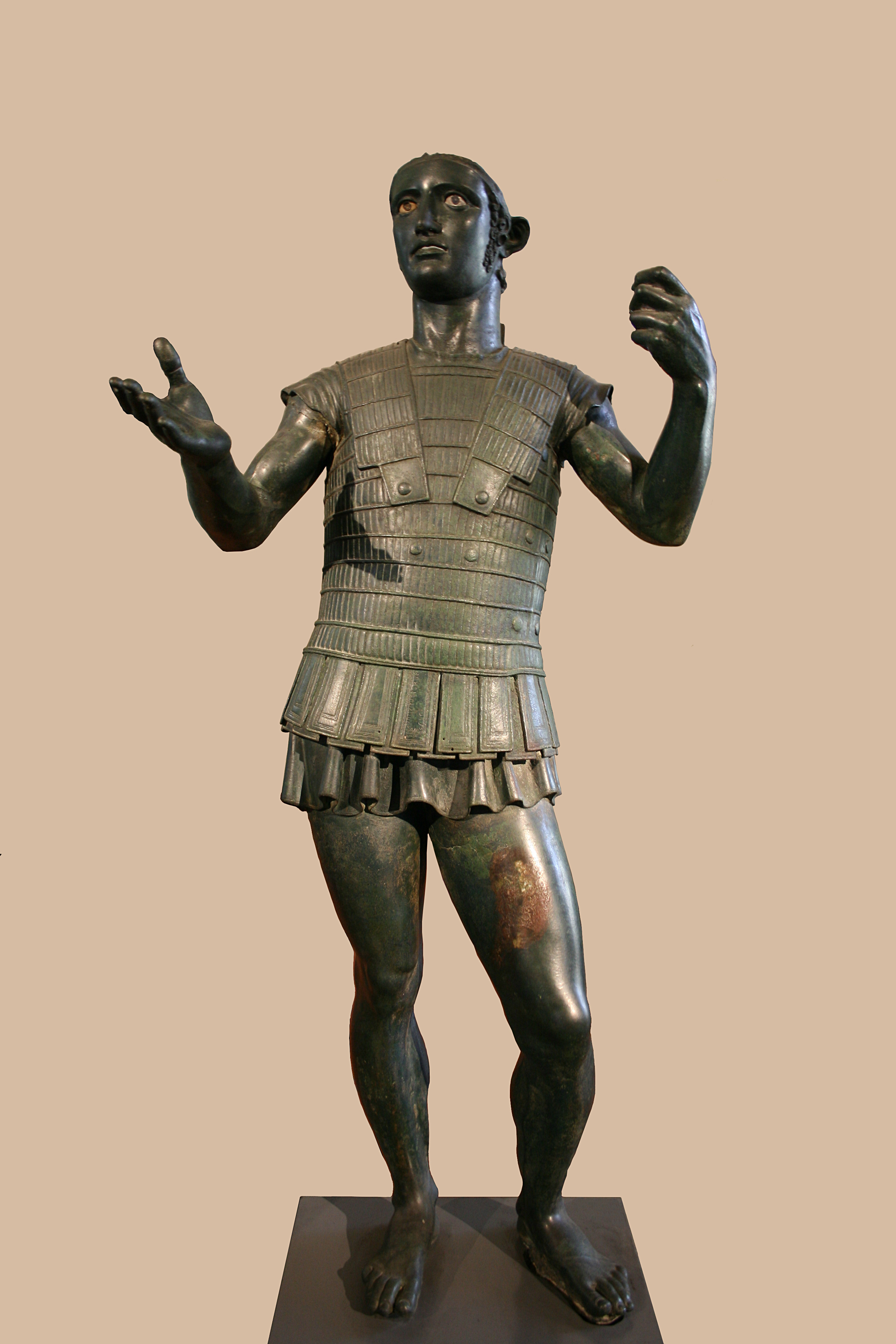
The Mars of Todi, a life-sized bronze sculpture of a soldier making a votive offering, late 5th to early 4th century BC

Dionysius of Halicarnassus asserted:

Indeed, those probably come nearest to the truth who declare that the nation migrated from nowhere else, but was native to the country, since it is found to be a very ancient nation and to agree with no other either in its language or in its manner of living.

With this passage, Dionysius launched the autochthonous theory, that the core element of the Etruscans, who spoke the Etruscan language, were of "Terra (Earth) itself"; that is, on location for so long that they appeared to be the original or native inhabitants. They are therefore the owners of the Villanovan culture.

Picking up this theme, Bonfante (2002) states:

...the history of the Etruscan people extends ... from c. 1200 to c. 100 BC. Many sites of the chief Etruscan cities of historical times were continuously occupied from the Iron Age Villanovan period on. Much confusion would have been avoided if archaeologists had used the name 'Proto-Etruscan' .... For in fact the people ... did not appear suddenly. Nor did they suddenly start to speak Etruscan.

An additional elaboration conjectures that the Etruscans were

...an ethnic island of very ancient peoples isolated by the flood of Indo-European speakers.

In 1942, the Italian historian Massimo Pallottino published a book entitled The Etruscans (which would be released in English in 1955). Pallottino presented various hypotheses that gained wide acceptance in the archaeological community. He said "no one would dream of asking where Italians or Frenchmen came from originally; it is the formation of the Italian and French nations that we study." He meant that the formation process for Etruscan civilization took place in Etruria or nearby. Formulating a different point of view on the same evidence, Pallottino says:

... we must consider the concept 'Etruscan' as ... attached to ... a nation that flourished in Etruria between the eighth and first centuries BC... We may discuss the provenance of each of these elements but a more appropriate concept ... would be that of formation... the formative process of the nation can only have taken place on the territories of the Etruscans proper; and we are able to witness the final stages of this process.

J. P. Mallory compares the Etruscans to other remnant non Indo-European central Mediterranean populations, such as the Basques of the Iberian Peninsula and southern France, who absorbed the art styles and alphabet of their Greek neighbors.

The British archaeologists, Graeme Barker and Tom Rasmussen, were also fervent supporters of the "autochthonous theory". In their book, The Etruscans, they state, "There is no evidence for the kind of cultural break at the Villanovan/Etruscan transition envisaged by either of the 'plantation' models from the eastern Mediterranean, or for a folk movement of either kind from continental Europe in the Late Bronze Age,". Thus, inferring that the Etruscans were indigenous to Italy and descended from the previous communities of Etruria.

Many supporters of this theory also believed that the Etruscans had foreign influences on their culture. For instance, the historian, Mario Torelli agreed with Dionysius's claims and believed that the Etruscans inherited elements of their culture from other Italic peoples. Robert Leighton also agreed with the "autochthonous theory", but he believed the Etruscan's culture was impacted by Greek and Phoenician merchants.

== Historical claims of allochthonous (outside) origin ==
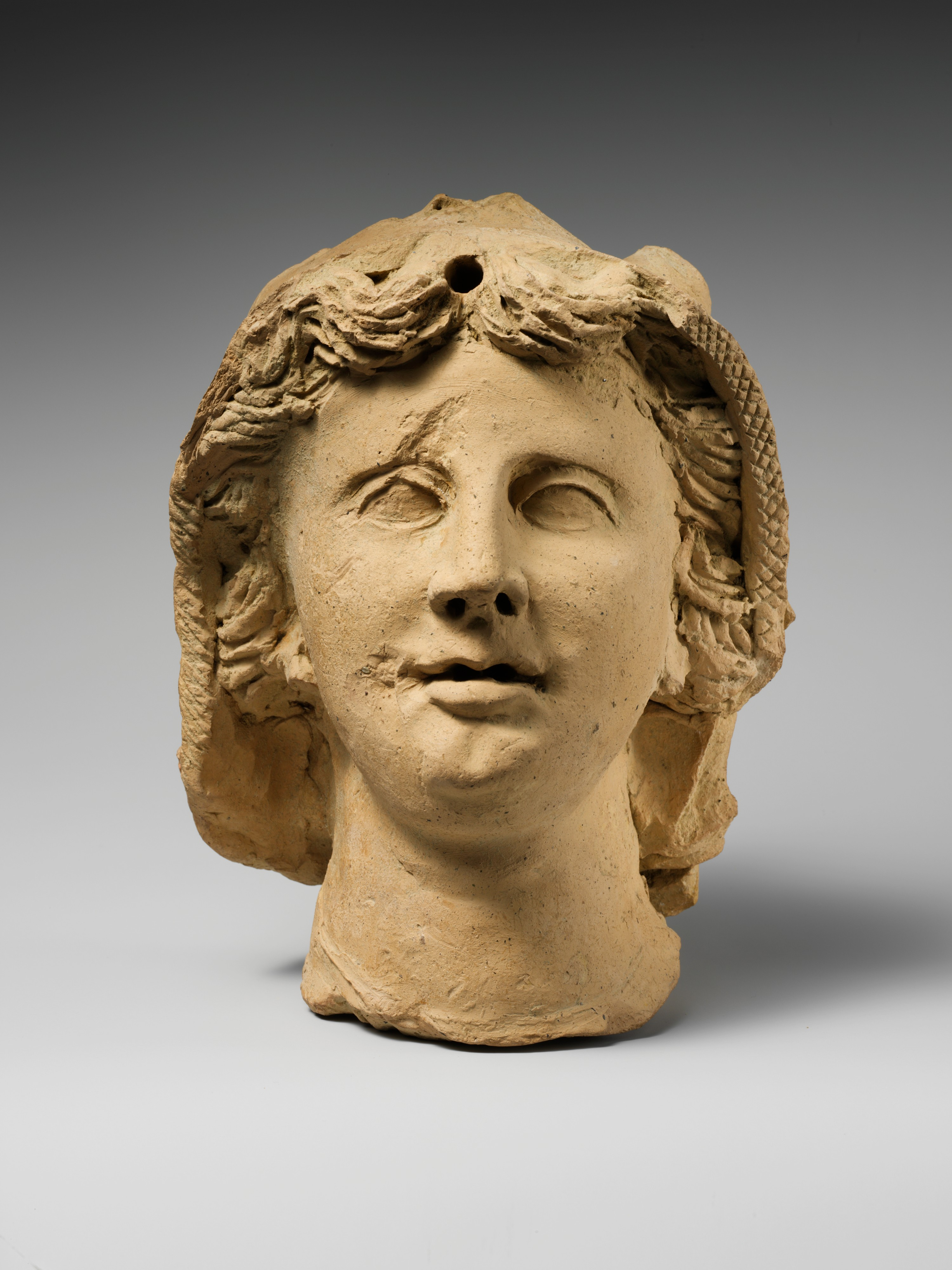
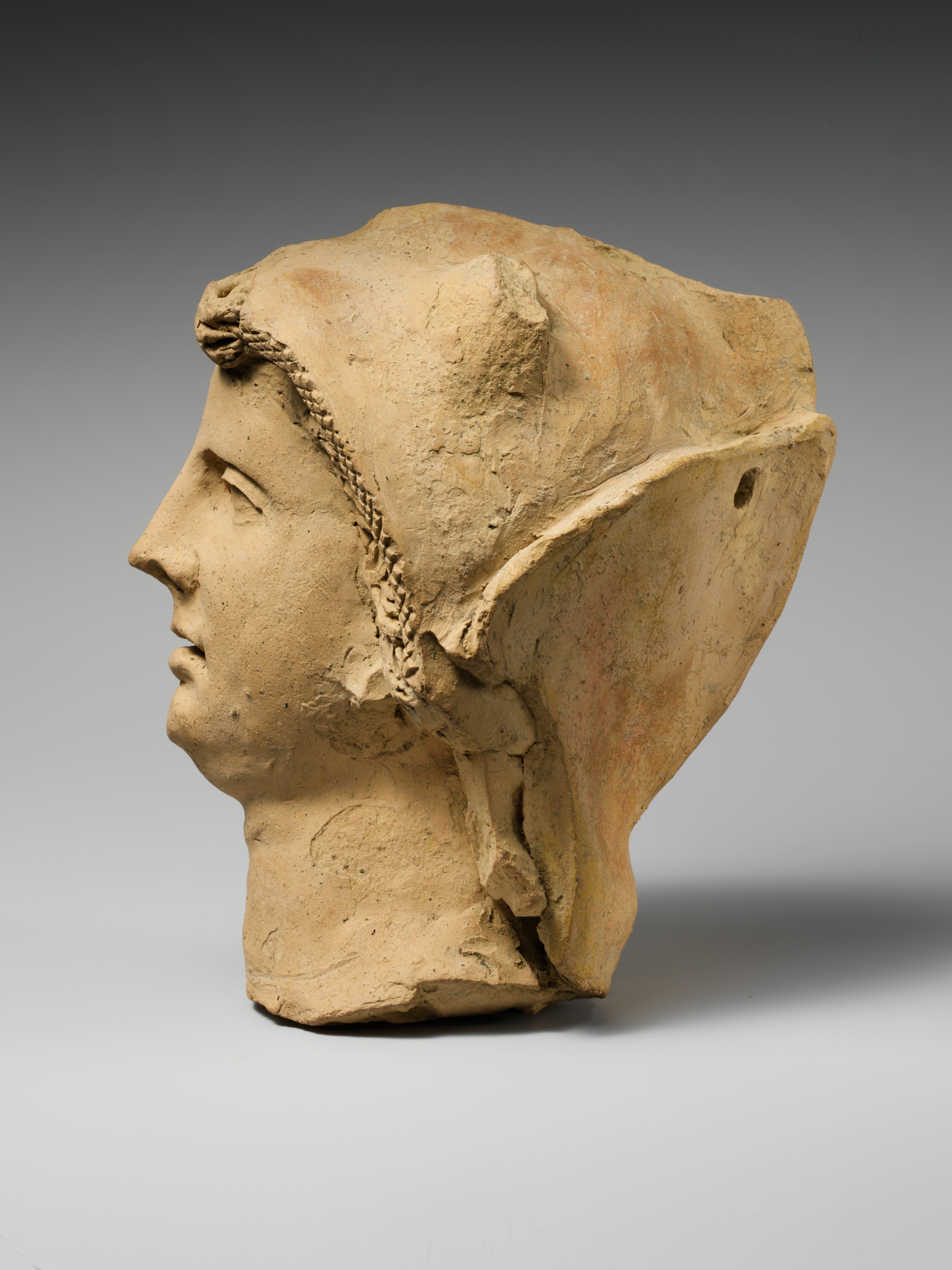
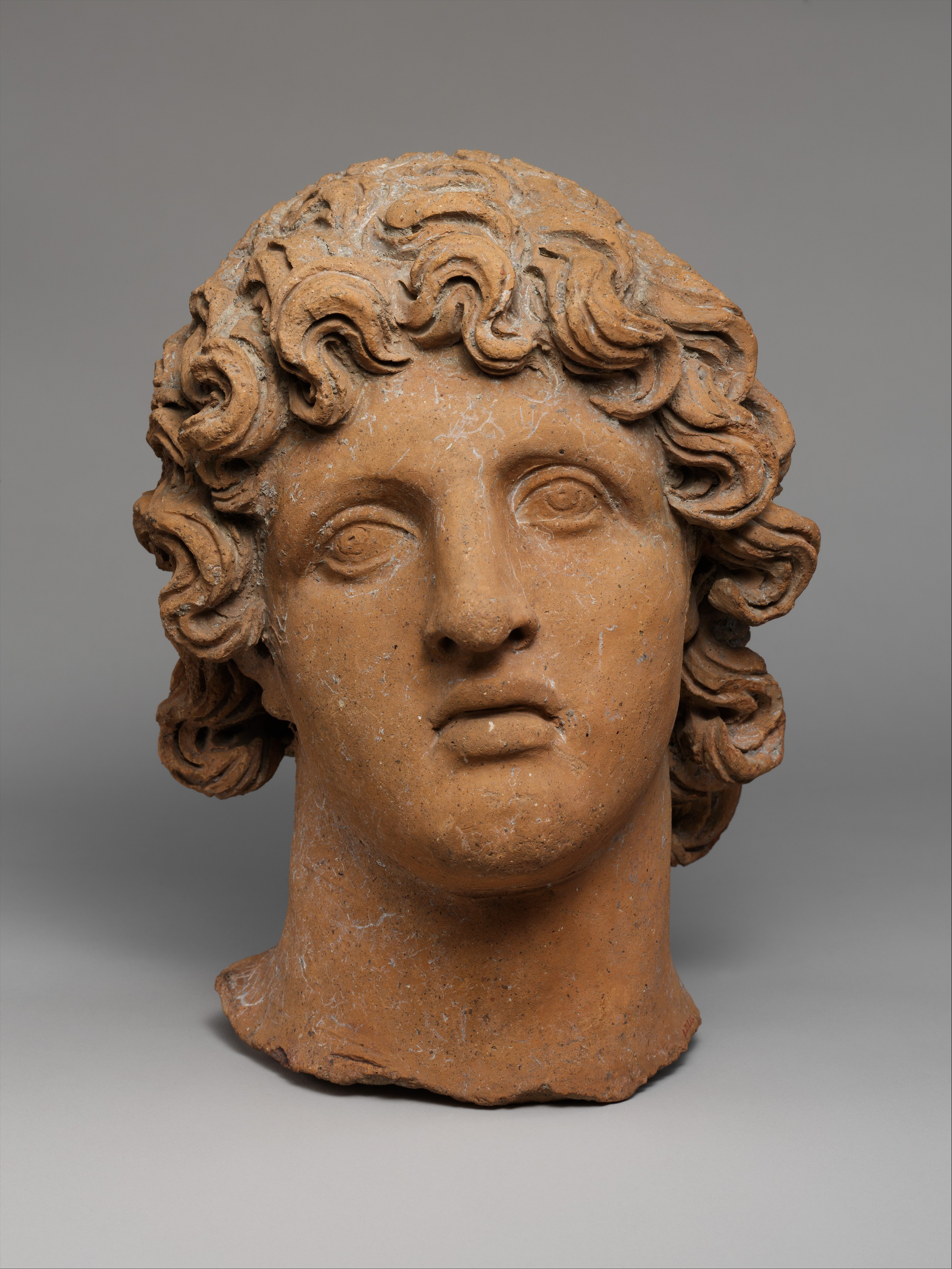
Terracotta heads of Etruscan male youths, with one wearing a helmet and the other bare-headed, 3rd–2nd centuries BC, Metropolitan Museum of Art

Herodotus reports the Lydians' claim that the Etruscans came from Lydia in Asia Minor (i.e. Anatolia):

This is their story: [...] their king divided the people into two groups, and made them draw lots, so that the one group should remain and the other leave the country; he himself was to be the head of those who drew the lot to remain there, and his son, whose name was Tyrrhenus, of those who departed. [...] they came to the Ombrici, where they founded cities and have lived ever since. They no longer called themselves Lydians, but Tyrrhenians, after the name of the king's son who had led them there.

Since ancient times, doubts have been raised about the accuracy of Herodotus' claims. Xanthus of Lydia, originally from Sardis and a great connoisseur of the history of the Lydians, wasn't aware of a Lydian origin of the Etruscans, as reported by Greek historian Dionysius of Halicarnassus.

Xanthus of Lydia, who was well acquainted with ancient history as any man and who may be regarded as an authority second to none on the history of his own country [and yet he] neither names Tyrrhenus in any part of his history as a ruler of the Lydians nor knows anything of the landing of a colony of Lydians in Italy

The classical scholar Michael Grant commented on this story, writing that it "is based on erroneous etymologies, like many other traditions about the origins of 'fringe' peoples of the Greek world". Grant writes there is evidence that the Etruscans themselves spread it to make their trading easier in Asia Minor when many cities in Asia Minor, and the Etruscans themselves, were at war with the Greeks.

The French scholar Dominique Briquel also disputed the historical validity of Herodotus' account. Briquel demonstrated that "the story of an exodus from Lydia to Italy was a deliberate political fabrication created in the Hellenized milieu of the court at Sardis in the early 6th century BC." Briquel also commented that "the traditions handed down from the Greek authors on the origins of the Etruscan people are only the expression of the image that Etruscans' allies or adversaries wanted to divulge. For no reason, stories of this kind should be considered historical documents".

However, the Greek historian Dionysius of Halicarnassus objected that the Tyrrhenian (Etruscan) culture and language shared nothing with the Lydian. He stated:

For this reason, therefore, I am persuaded that the Pelasgians are a different people from the Tyrrhenians. And I do not believe, either, that the Tyrrhenians were a colony of the Lydians; for they do not use the same language as the latter, nor can it be alleged that, though they no longer speak a similar tongue, they still retain some other indications of their mother country. For they neither worship the same gods as the Lydians nor make use of similar laws or institutions, but in these very respects they differ more from the Lydians than from the Pelasgians.

== The Sea Peoples theory ==
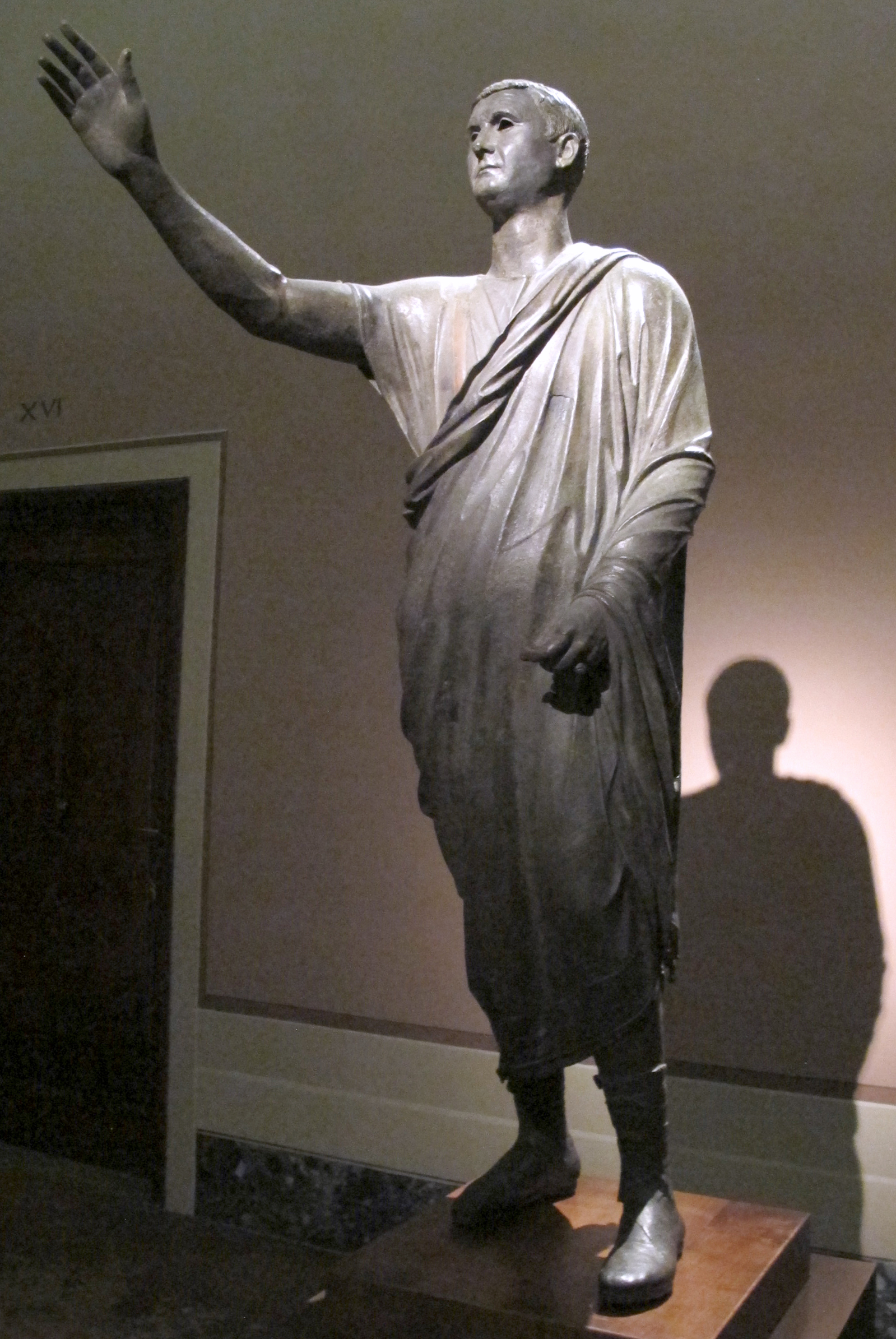
The Orator, c. 100 BC, an Etrusco-Roman bronze statue depicting Aule Metele (Latin: Aulus Metellus), an Etruscan man wearing a Roman toga while engaged in rhetoric; the statue features an inscription in the Etruscan alphabet

The notion that the Etruscans or Tyrrhenians might have been among the Sea Peoples of the 14th–13th century BC has long been a matter of speculation. Despite Massimo Pallottino's assimilation of the Teresh of Egyptian inscriptions with Tyrrhenoi, there is no further evidence to connect the Sea Peoples to the Etruscans: the Etruscan autonym Rasna, does not lend itself to the Tyrrhenian derivation. Neither the Etruscan material culture or language has provided scholars with conclusive evidence regarding the Etruscans as one of the Sea Peoples. The Etruscan language, which has been partly deciphered, appears closely related to inscriptions found on the island of Lemnos. However, these are now interpreted by most scholars as evidence of west-to-east linguistic transmission, likely introduced by Etruscan traders or mariners operating in the northeastern Aegean, rather than a sign of eastern origin or colonization.

During the 6th to 5th centuries BC, the word "Tyrrhenians" was referred to the Etruscans, for whom the Tyrrhenian Sea is named, according to Strabo. In Pindar, the Tyrsenoi appear grouped with the Carthaginians as a threat to Magna Graecia:

I entreat you, son of Cronus, grant that the battle-shouts of the Carthaginians and Etruscans stay quietly at home, now that they have seen their arrogance bring lamentation to their ships off Cumae.

Thucydides mentions them together with the Pelasgians and associates them with Lemnian pirates and with the pre-Greek population of Attica. Lemnos remained relatively free of Greek influence up to Hellenistic times, and the Lemnos stele of the 6th century BC is inscribed with a language very similar to Etruscan. This has led to the postulation of a "Tyrrhenian language group" comprising Etruscan, Lemnian and Raetic. There is thus linguistic evidence of a relationship between the Lemnians and the Etruscans. Some scholars ascribe this link to Etruscan expansion between the 8th and 6th centuries BC, putting the homeland of the Etruscans in Italy and the Alps particularly because of their relation to the Alpine Raetic population. Adherents of this latter school of thought point to the legend of Lydian origin of the Etruscans referred to by Herodotus, and the statement of Livy that the Raetians were Etruscans driven into the mountains by the invading Gauls. Critics of this theory point to the very scanty evidence of a linguistic relationship of Etruscan with Indo-European, let alone Anatolian in particular, and to Dionysius of Halicarnassus who decidedly argues against an Etruscan-Lydian relationship. The Indo-European Lydian language is first attested some time after the Tyrrhenian migrants are said to have left for Italy.

== Differentiating between cultural origin and cultural influence ==
The origins of Etruscan civilization have long been debated. In recent decades, scholars have moved beyond migration-based origin theories, focusing instead on the complex processes of cultural formation and distinguishing between cultural origins and external influences.

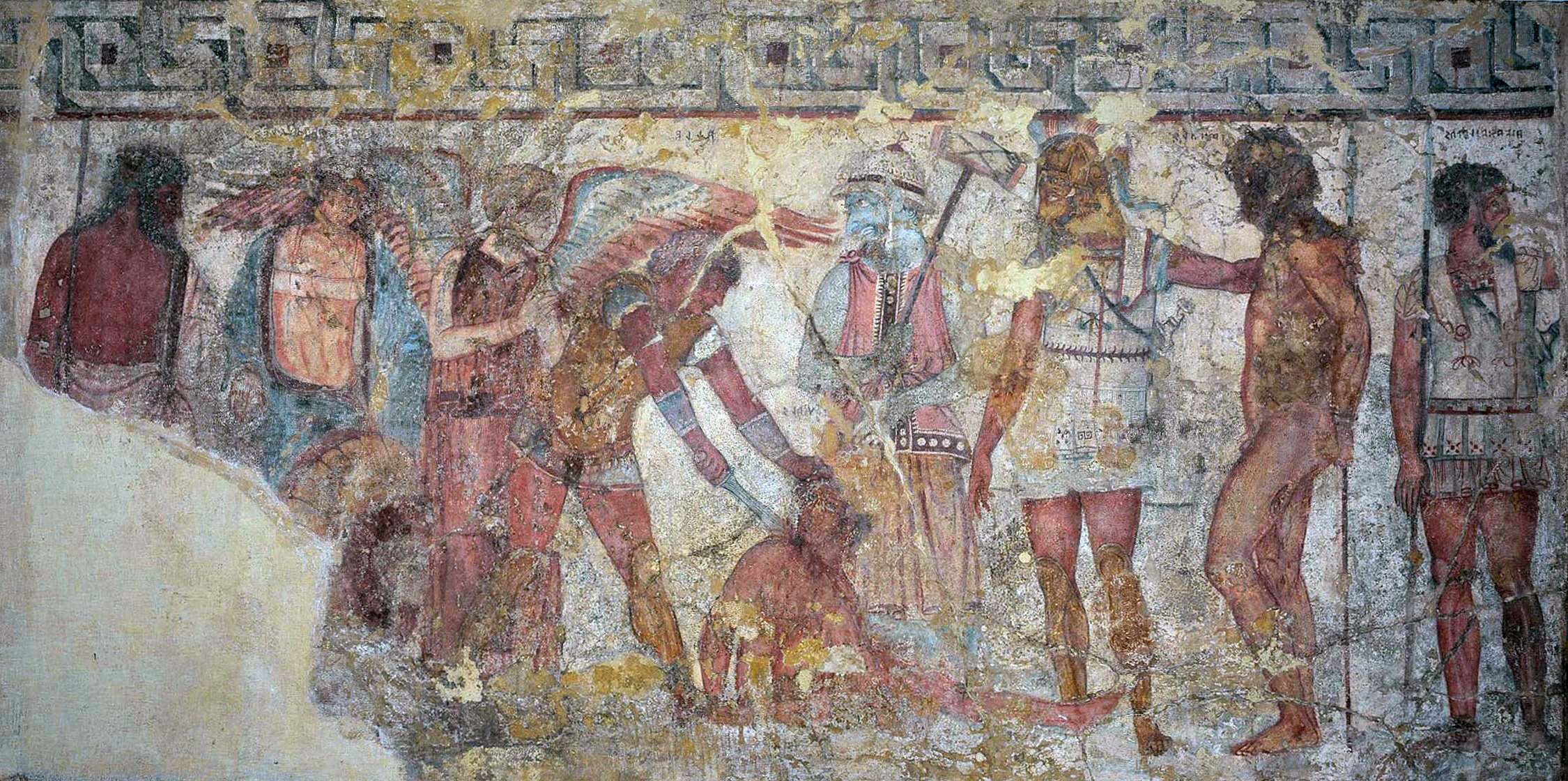
Fresco in the François Tomb (4th century BC)

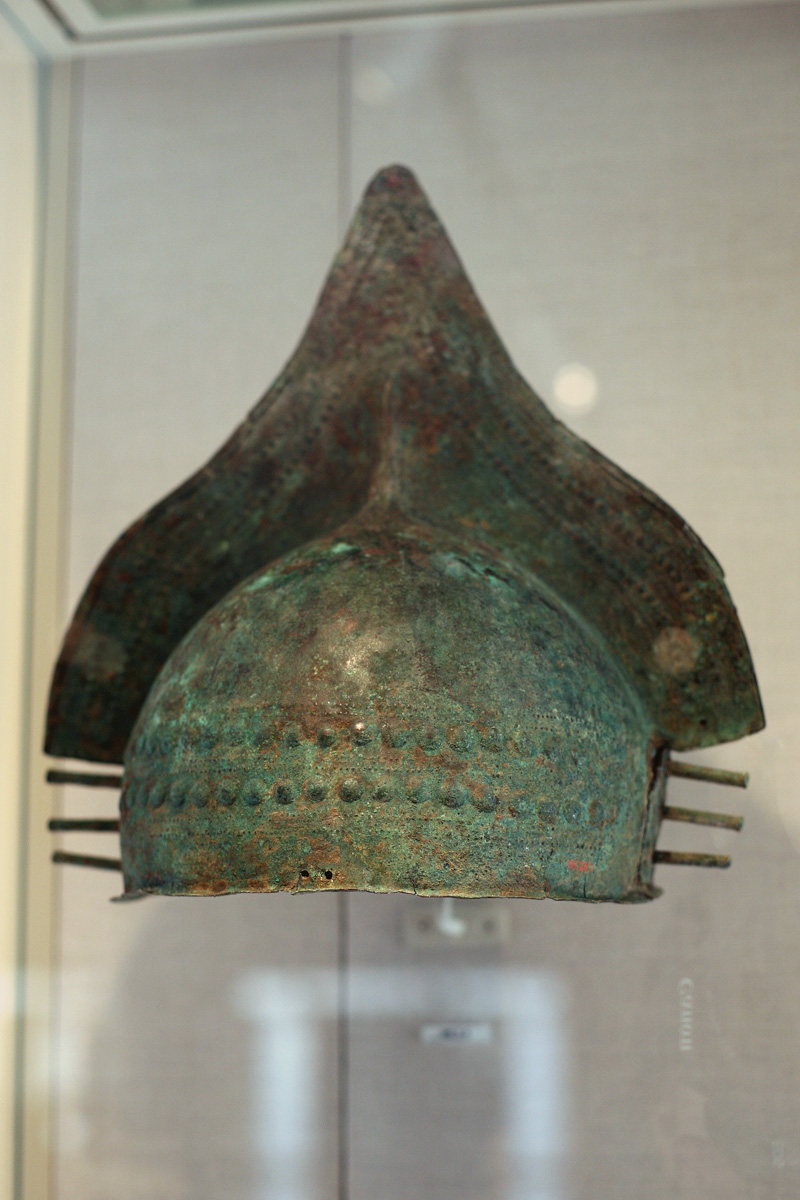
Etruscan helmet (9th century BC)

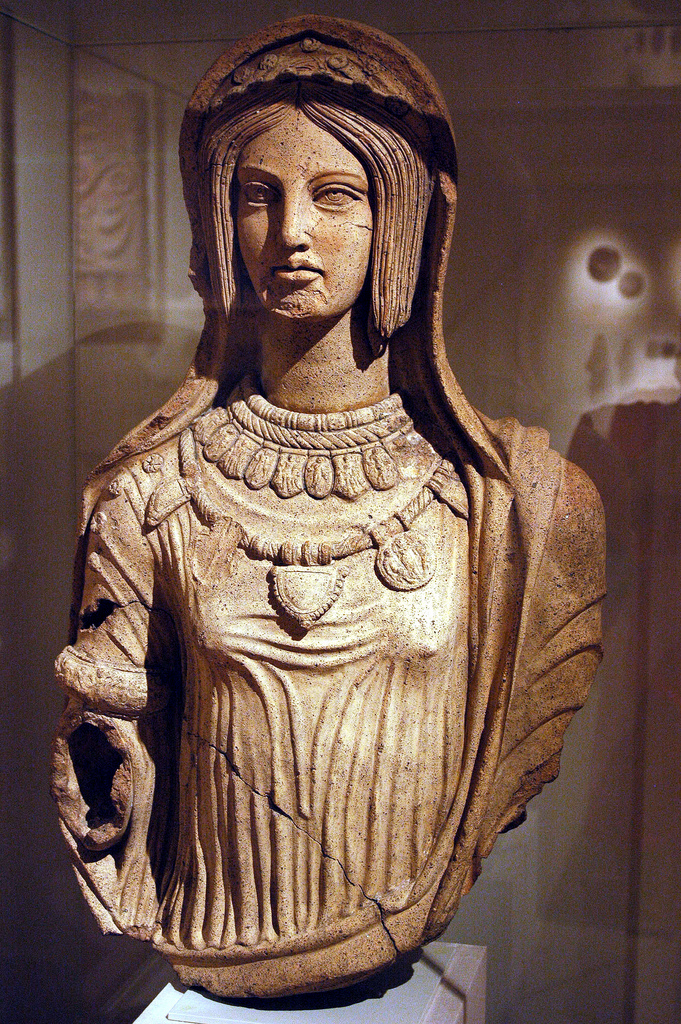
Etruscan terracotta figure of a young woman, late 4th–early 3rd century BC

Classical authors such as Herodotus and Dionysius of Halicarnassus were among the first to offer explanations for Etruscan origins. Herodotus proposed a Lydian migration led by King Tyrrhenus, a theory consistent with the Greek tradition of explaining cultural origins through heroic migrations. Dionysius, by contrast, emphasized an autochthonous origin, suggesting the Etruscans were native to Italy and had no cultural or linguistic connection to Lydia.

Modern scholars tend to approach these ancient sources critically. John Bryan Ward-Perkins, for example, argued that Greek and Roman writers often projected political or cultural biases onto their accounts of other peoples. He referred to these narratives as "a hostile tradition" and described them as seen through "a veil of interpretation, misunderstanding, and at times, plain invention." Dominique Briquel similarly concluded that stories of eastern origin were often politically motivated and should not be regarded as historical evidence.

In the mid-20th century, Italian archaeologist Massimo Pallottino revived the autochthonous theory, arguing that Etruscan civilization emerged through a local process of cultural formation in Etruria. He acknowledged external influences but maintained that these occurred on Italian soil and did not constitute evidence of population replacement.

Linguistic evidence has also shaped this debate. R.S.P. Beekes argued that the close relationship between the Etruscan and Lemnian languages supports a migration from the eastern Mediterranean. However, Alison E. Cooley countered that such similarities may result from cultural contact, such as trade, rather than shared ethnic origins. Recent scholarship on the Raetic language and the hypothesized Tyrrhenian language family generally regards Lemnian and Etruscan as related languages. While the direction and nature of their relationship have been the subject of prolonged debate, an increasing number of scholars propose that the Lemnian language may reflect Etruscan influence transmitted through maritime interactions, resulting from a west-to-east movement.

Some modern sociolinguists emphasize the broader role of language in cultural identity formation. Kari Gibson has described language as a "powerful symbol of national and ethnic identity," shaping how communities perceive themselves. Literary theorist Gloria Anzaldúa similarly described language and ethnicity as interwoven, stating: "Ethnic identity is twin skin to linguistic identity." While these perspectives are modern and do not directly address ancient societies, they are sometimes cited to highlight how language may contribute to group identity.

Archaeological evidence has provided critical insights into Etruscan society and its development. Burial sites, such as those in the Monterozzi necropolis in Tarquinia, offer rich material evidence. For example, the Tomb of the Leopards, dating to the 5th century BC, depicts men and women dining together with similar crowns, suggesting social roles for women that differ markedly from those in Greek society. Pallottino argued that such representations reflect a distinct cultural worldview shaped within Etruria, rather than imported from abroad.

Other tombs, like the Tomb of Hunting and Fishing, depict scenes in which humans appear subordinate to nature—a reversal of the dominant artistic conventions in many ancient societies. Scholars interpret this as indicative of a local artistic and philosophical tradition.

Although Etruscan culture was influenced by interactions with Greeks, Phoenicians, and other Mediterranean peoples, modern scholars increasingly support the conclusion that the Etruscan civilization developed locally out of the Villanovan culture, with external contact shaping but not defining its formation.

== Archaeological evidence and modern etruscology ==
Evolution of the Villanovan culture.

The question of Etruscan origins has long been a subject of interest and debate among historians. In modern times, all the evidence gathered so far by etruscologists points to an indigenous origin of the Etruscans. Archaeologically there is no evidence for a migration of the Lydians or the Pelasgians into Etruria. Modern etruscologists and archaeologists, such as Massimo Pallottino (1947), have shown that early historians' assumptions and assertions on the subject were groundless. The French etruscologist Dominique Briquel, whose numerous writings were devoted to this subject, explained in detail why he believes that ancient Greek historians' writings on Etruscan origins should not even count as historical documents. He argues that the ancient story of the Etruscans' 'Lydian origins' was a deliberate, politically motivated fabrication, and that ancient Greeks inferred a connection between the Tyrrhenians and the Pelasgians solely on the basis of certain Greek and local traditions and on the mere fact that there had been trade between the Etruscans and Greeks. He noted that, even if these stories include historical facts suggesting contact, such contact is more plausibly traceable to cultural exchange than to migration.

Several archaeologists who have analyzed Bronze Age and Iron Age remains that were excavated in the territory of historical Etruria have pointed out that no evidence has been found, related either to material culture or to social practices, that can support a migration theory from the Aegean Sea. The most marked and radical change that has been archaeologically attested in the area is the adoption, starting in about the 12th century BC, of the funeral rite of incineration in terracotta urns, which is a Continental European practice, derived from the Urnfield culture; there is nothing about it that suggests an ethnic contribution from Asia Minor or the Near East. One of the most common mistakes for a long time, even among some scholars of the past, has been to associate the later Orientalizing period of Etruscan civilization, due, as has been amply demonstrated by archaeologists, to contacts with the Greeks and the Eastern Mediterranean and not mass migrations, with the question of their origins. The facial features (the profile, almond-shaped eyes, large nose) in the frescoes and sculptures, and the depiction of reddish-brown men and light-skinned women, influenced by archaic Greek art, followed the artistic traditions from the Eastern Mediterranean, that had spread even among the Greeks themselves, and to a lesser extent also to other several civilizations in the central and western Mediterranean up to the Iberian Peninsula. Actually, many of the tombs of the Late Orientalizing and Archaic periods, such as the Tomb of the Augurs, the Tomb of the Triclinium or the Tomb of the Leopards, as well as other tombs from the archaic period in the Monterozzi necropolis in Tarquinia, were painted by Greek painters or, in any case, foreigner artists. These images have, therefore, a very limited value for a realistic representation of the Etruscan population. It was only from the end of the 4th century B.C. that evidence of physiognomic portraits began to be found in Etruscan art and Etruscan portraiture became more realistic.

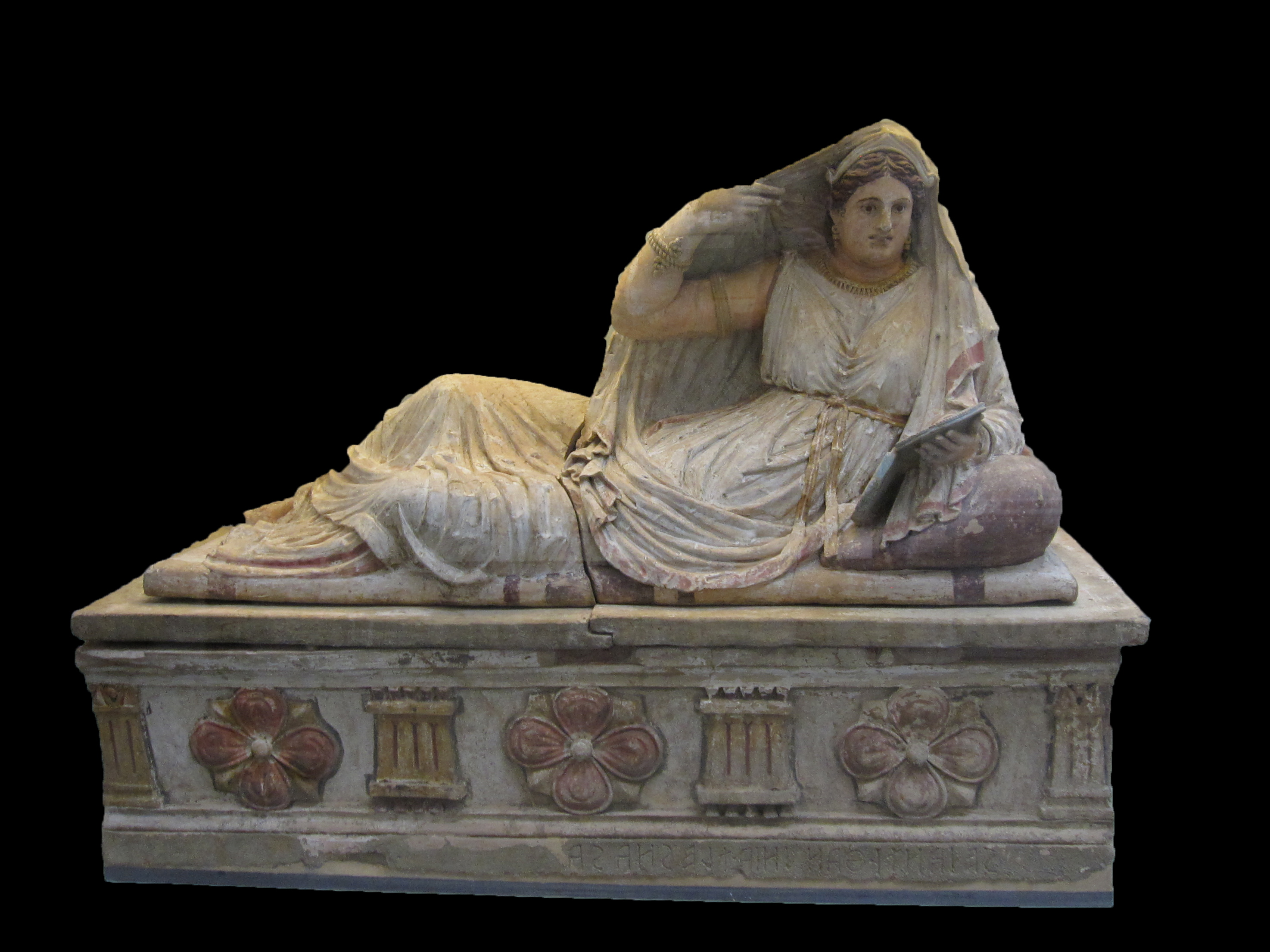
Painted terracotta Sarcophagus of Seianti Hanunia Tlesnasa, about 150–130 BC.

A 2012 survey of the previous 30 years' archaeological findings, based on excavations of the major Etruscan cities, showed a continuity of culture from the last phase of the Bronze Age (12th–10th century BC) to the Iron Age (9th–8th century BC). This is evidence that the Etruscan civilization, which emerged around 900 BC, was built by people whose ancestors had inhabited that region for at least the previous 200 years, as has also been confirmed by anthropological and genetic studies. Based on this cultural continuity, there is now a consensus among archaeologists that Proto-Etruscan culture developed, during the last phase of the Bronze Age, from the indigenous Proto-Villanovan culture, and that the subsequent Iron Age Villanovan culture is most accurately described as an early phase of the Etruscan civilization. According to Renato Peroni, a prominent archaeologist specializing in the prehistory and protohistory of Italy and an advocate for the autochthonous origins of the Etruscans, the archaeological continuity in Etruria can be traced back at least to the Bell Beaker culture. A significant discontinuity is recorded around 2300 BC, marking the transition from the Copper Age to the Early Bronze Age. From 2300 BC onward, Etruria exhibits substantial settlement continuity. During this period, a constellation of local groups, all broadly associated with the Bell Beaker tradition, is already discernible in Tuscany and adjacent regions.

It is possible that there were contacts between northern-central Italy and the Mycenaean world at the end of the Bronze Age. However, contacts between the inhabitants of Etruria and inhabitants of Greece, Aegean Sea Islands, Asia Minor, and the Near East are attested only centuries later, as well as those with the Celtic world, when Etruscan civilization was already flourishing and Etruscan ethnogenesis was well established. The first of these attested contacts relate to the Greek colonies in Southern Italy and the Nuragics and Sardo-Punics in Sardinia, and the consequent orientalizing period.

== Genetic evidence ==
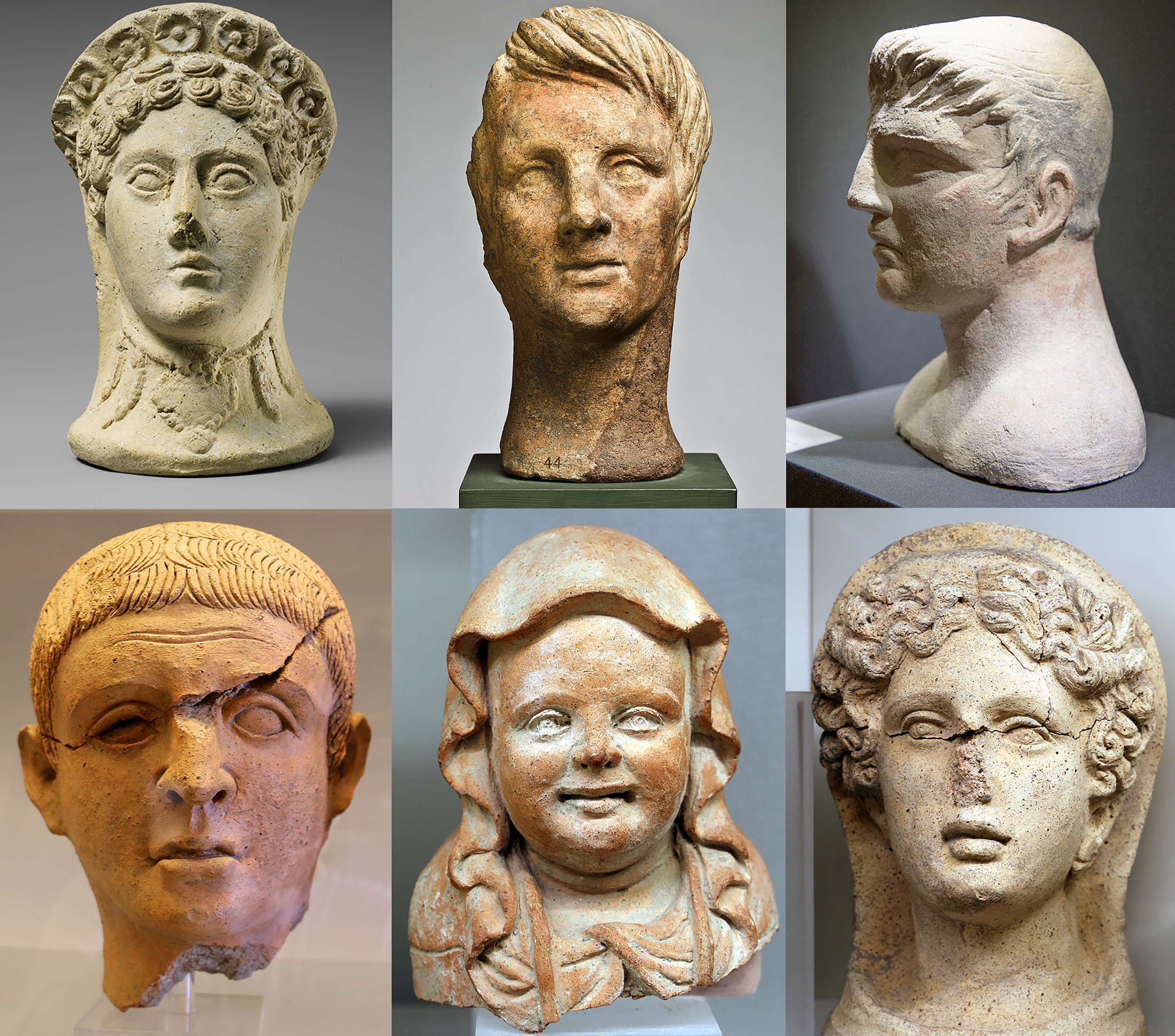
Etruscan votive heads, IV-II century BC

There have been numerous biological studies on the Etruscan origins, the oldest of which dates back to the 1950s when research was still based on blood tests of modern samples, and DNA analysis (including the analysis of ancient samples) was not yet possible. It is only in very recent years, starting in 2019, with the development of archaeogenetics, that comprehensive studies containing the whole genome sequencing (WGS) of Etruscan samples have been published, including autosomal DNA and Y-DNA, autosomal DNA being the "most valuable to understand what really happened in an individual's history", as stated by geneticist David Reich, whereas previously studies were based only on mitochondrial DNA analysis, which contains less and limited information. The direct testing of ancient Etruscan DNA supports a deep, local origin, while the testing of modern samples as a proxy for Etruscans has proven to be rather inconclusive and inconsistent.

A 2019 genetic study published in the journal Science analyzed the autosomal DNA of 11 Iron Age samples from the areas around Rome, including for the first time the whole genome sequencing (WGS) of some samples from Etruscan tombs, and concluded that Etruscans (900-600 BC) and the Latins (900-200 BC) from Latium vetus were genetically similar, and Etruscans also had Steppe-related ancestry despite speaking a pre-Indo-European language. A 2021 genetic study published in the journal Science Advances analyzed the autosomal DNA of 48 Iron Age individuals from Tuscany and Lazio and confirmed that the Etruscan individuals displayed the ancestral component Steppe in the same percentages as found in the previously analyzed Iron Age Latins, and that the Etruscans' DNA completely lacks a signal of recent admixture with Anatolia or the Eastern Mediterranean, concluding that the Etruscans were autochthonous and they had a genetic profile similar to their Latin neighbors. Both Etruscans and Latins joined firmly the European cluster, 75% of the Etruscan male individuals were found to belong to haplogroup R1b-M269 and its subclades, especially R1b-P312 and its derivative R1b-L2 whose direct ancestor is R1b-U152, while the most common mitochondrial DNA haplogroup among the Etruscans was H. Iron Age Etruscans from central Italy could be modelled as deriving 50% of their ancestry from Central European Bell Beakers, represented by Germany Bell Beaker, with around 25-30% Steppe-related ancestry, and the rest of their ancestry from a local Chalcolithic population. The conclusions of these studies have been confirmed by later ones.

In the collective volume Etruscology published in 2017, British archaeologist Phil Perkins provides an analysis of the state of DNA studies and writes that "none of the DNA studies to date conclusively prove that Etruscans were an intrusive population in Italy that originated in the Eastern Mediterranean or Anatolia" and "there are indications that the evidence of DNA can support the theory that Etruscan people are autochthonous in central Italy".

In his book A Short History of Humanity published in 2021, German geneticist Johannes Krause, co-director of the Max Planck Institute for Evolutionary Anthropology in Jena, concludes that it is likely that the Etruscan language (as well as Basque, Paleo-Sardinian and Minoan) "developed on the continent in the course of the Neolithic Revolution".

=== Archaeogenetics and ancient DNA ===
A 2021 study (Posth et al. 2021) focused entirely on the question of the origins of the Etruscans, analyzed the Y-chromosome, mitochondrial DNA, and autosomal DNA of 82 ancient samples from Etruria (Tuscany and Latium) and southern Italy (Basilicata) spanning from 800 BC to 1000 AD, including 48 Iron Age individuals. The study observed that in the samples of Etruscan individuals from Tuscany and Lazio the ancestral component Steppe was present in the same percentages found in the previously analyzed samples of Iron Age Latins, and added that in the DNA of the Etruscans was completely absent a signal of recent admixture with Anatolia or the Eastern Mediterranean. The study concluded that the Etruscans were autochthonous and they had a genetic profile similar to that of their early Iron Age Latin neighbors. Both Etruscans and Latins belonged firmly to the European cluster: 75% of the samples of Etruscan male individuals were found to belong to haplogroup R1b, especially R1b-P312 and its derivative R1b-L2 whose direct ancestor is R1b-U152. Regarding mitochondrial DNA haplogroups, the most prevalent was largely H, followed by J and T. Uniparental marker data and autosomal DNA data from samples of Iron Age Etruscan individuals suggest that Etruria received migrations with a large ancestral Steppe component during the 2nd millennium BC, related to the spread of Indo-European languages, starting with the Bell Beaker culture, and that these migrations merged with populations of the oldest pre-Indo-European layer present since at least the Neolithic period, but it was the latter's language that survived, a situation similar to what happened in the Basque region of northern Spain. The study also concluded that the samples analyzed show that the Etruscans kept their genetic profile unchanged for almost 1000 years, indicating the sparse presence in Etruria of foreigners, and that a demographic change in Etruria occurred only from the Roman imperial period, in which there is the intermixture into the local population of ancestral components from the Eastern Mediterranean Sea. Analysis of samples of individuals who lived in the Roman imperial period and those of the Medieval Age also suggest that the genetic landscape of present-day central Italy was formed largely around 1000 years ago after the Barbarian invasions, and that the arrival of the Germanic Lombards in Italy contributed to the formation of the gene pool of the modern population of Tuscany and northern Latium.

The conclusions of the 2021 study are in line with those of an earlier 2019 study, the first to publish analyses of whole genome sequencing of Etruscan samples, although the 2019 is more focused on ancient Rome than the question of Etruscan origins. The 2019 genetic study, published in the journal Science, analyzed the remains of eleven Iron Age individuals from the areas around Rome, of which four were Etruscan individuals, one buried in Veio Grotta Gramiccia from the Villanovan period (900-800 BC) and three buried in La Mattonara Necropolis near Civitavecchia from the Orientalizing period (700-600 BC). The study concluded that Etruscans (900–600 BC) and the Latins (900–500 BC) from Latium vetus were genetically similar, genetic differences between the examined Etruscans and Latins were found to be insignificant. The Etruscan individuals and contemporary Latins were distinguished from preceding populations of Italy by the presence of 30.7% steppe ancestry. Their DNA was a mixture of two-thirds Copper Age ancestry (EEF + WHG; Etruscans ~66–72%, Latins ~62–75%) and one-third Steppe-related ancestry (Etruscans ~27–33%, Latins ~24–37%) (with the EEF component mainly deriving from Neolithic-era migrants to Europe from Anatolia and the WHG being local Western European hunter-gatherers, with both components, along with that from the steppe, being found in virtually all European populations). The only sample of Y-DNA extracted belonged to haplogroup J-M12 (J2b-L283), found in an individual dated 700-600 BC, and carried exactly the M314 derived allele also found in a Middle Bronze Age individual from Croatia (1631-1531 calBCE). While the four samples of mtDNA extracted belonged to haplogroups U5a1, H, T2b32, K1a4. Therefore, Etruscans had also Steppe-related ancestry despite speaking a pre-Indo-European language.

In 2024, 6 individuals of Etruscan remains from Tarquinia, Lazio, dated the 9th-7th Century BC, were studied and confirmed the previous finds, Etruscans were an indigenous population. The admixture model showed that they were 84-92% Italy Bell Beaker and 8-26% additional Yamnaya Samara (Steppe-related) ancestry, but with one individual being more similar to Iron Age populations from Scandinavia, and north-west Europe. The two male individuals studied for Y-Chromosome belonged to the J2b/J-M12 lineage, and the five studied mitochondrial haplogroups were typical of post-Neolithic Europe. Phenotypic traits showed blue-eyes, light/dark brown hair, and pale to intermediate skin tones.

=== Previous archaeogenetic studies on mtDNA only ===
A very large mtDNA study from 2013 indicates, based on maternally-inherited DNA from 30 bone samples taken from tombs dating from the eight century to the first century BC from Tuscany and Lazio, that the Etruscans were a native population. The study extracted and typed the hypervariable region of mitochondrial DNA of 14 individuals buried in two Etruscan necropoleis, analyzing them along with previously analyzed Etruscan mtDNA, other ancient European mtDNA, modern and Medieval samples from Tuscany, and 4,910 modern individuals from the Mediterranean basin. The ancient (30 Etruscans, 27 Medieval Tuscans) and modern DNA sequences (370 Tuscans) were subjected to several million computer simulation runs, showing that the Etruscans can be considered ancestral to Medieval and, especially in the subpopulations from Casentino and Volterra, of modern Tuscans; modern populations from Murlo and Florence, by contrast, were shown not to continue the Medieval population. By further considering two Anatolian samples (35 and 123 individuals), it was estimated that the genetic links between Tuscany and Anatolia date back to at least 5,000 years ago, and the "most likely separation time between Tuscany and Western Anatolia falls around 7,600 years ago", strongly suggesting that the Etruscan culture developed locally, and not as an immediate consequence of immigration from the Eastern Mediterranean shores. According to the study, ancient Etruscan mtDNA is closest among modern European populations and is not particularly close to Anatolian or other Eastern Mediterranean populations. Among ancient populations based on mtDNA, ancient Etruscans were found to be closest to LBK Neolithic farmers from Central Europe.

A mtDNA study, published in 2018 in the journal American Journal of Physical Anthropology, compared both ancient and modern samples from Tuscany, from the Prehistory, Etruscan age, Roman age, Renaissance, and Present-day, and concluded that the Etruscans appear as a local population, intermediate between the prehistoric and the other samples, placing in the temporal network between the Eneolithic Age and the Roman Age.

These results are largely in line with previous mtDNA results from 2004 (in a smaller study also based on ancient DNA), and contradictory to results from 2007 (based on modern DNA). The 2004 study was based on mitochondrial DNA (mtDNA) from 80 bone samples, reduced to 28 bone samples in the analysis phase, taken from tombs dating from the seventh century to the third century BC from Veneto, Tuscany, Lazio and Campania. This study found that the ancient DNA extracted from the Etruscan remains had some affinities with modern European populations including Germans, English people from Cornwall, and Tuscans in Italy. The study was marred by concerns that mtDNA sequences from the archaeological samples represented severely damaged or contaminated DNA; however, subsequent investigation showed that the samples passed the most stringent tests of DNA degradation available.

=== Older studies based on modern samples only ===
An mtDNA study from 2007, by contrast, earlier suggested a Near Eastern origin. Achilli et al. (2007) found in a modern sample of 86 individuals from Murlo, a small town in southern Tuscany, an unusually high frequency (17.5%) of supposed Near Eastern mtDNA haplogroups, while other Tuscan populations do not show the same striking feature. Based on this result Achilli concluded that "their data support the scenario of a post-Neolithic genetic input from the Near East to the present-day population of Tuscany, a scenario in agreement with the Lydian origin of Etruscans". This research has been much criticized by archaeologists, etruscologists and classicists. In the absence of any dating evidence, there is no direct link between this genetic input found in Murlo and the Etruscans. Furthermore, there is no evidence that these mtDNA haplogroups found in Murlo might be proof of an eastern origin of the Etruscans, as some of these mtDNA haplogroups have been found in other studies as early as the Neolithic and Aeneolithic in Italy and Germany. All the mtDNA haplogroups found in the modern sample from Murlo and classified by Achilli et al. as of Near Eastern origin are actually widespread in modern samples from other areas of Italy and Europe with no link with the Etruscans.

A recent Y-DNA study from 2018 on a modern sample of 113 individuals from Volterra, a town of Etruscan origin, Grugni at al. keeps all the possibilities open, although the autochthonous scenario is the most supported by numbers, and concludes that "the presence of J2a-M67* (2.7%) suggests contacts by sea with Anatolian people, the finding of the Central European lineage G2a-L497 (7.1%) at considerable frequency would rather support a Northern European origin of Etruscans, while the high incidence of European R1b lineages (R1b 49.8%, R1b-U152 24.5%) cannot rule out the scenario of an autochthonous process of formation of the Etruscan civilization from the preceding Villanovan society, as suggested by Dionysius of Halicarnassus". In Italy Y-DNA J2a-M67*, not yet found in Etruscan samples, is more widespread on the Adriatic Sea coast between Marche and Abruzzo, and not in those where once lived the Etruscans, and in the study has its peak in the Ionian side of Calabria. In 2014, a late Bronze Age Kyjatice culture sample in Hungary was found to be J2a1-M67, a couple of J2a1b were found in Late Neolithic samples from the LBK culture in Austria, a J2a1a was found in a Middle Neolithic Sopot culture sample from Croatia, a J2a was found in a Late Neolithic Lengyel Culture sample from Hungary. In 2019, in a Stanford study published in Science, two ancient samples from the Neolithic settlement of Ripabianca di Monterado in the province of Ancona, in the Marche region of Italy, were found to be Y-DNA J-L26 and J-M304. In 2021, two more ancient samples from the Chalcolitich settlement of Grotta La Sassa, in the province of Latina in southern Lazio, were found to be Y-DNA J2a7-Z2397. Therefore, Y-DNA J2a-M67 may be likely in Italy since the Neolithic and can't be the proof of recent contacts with Anatolia. In any case, J2a-M67 was not found among the Etruscan samples, unlike G2a-L497 and R1b-U152 who were actually found in the Etruscan individuals in really significant percentages.

Recent studies on the population structure of modern-day Italians have shown that in Italy there is a north–south cline for Y-chromosome lineages and autosomal loci, with a clear differentiation of peninsular Italians from Sardinians, and that modern Tuscans are the population of central Italy closest genetically to the inhabitants of northern Italy. A 2019 study, based on autosomal DNA of 1616 individuals from all 20 Italian administrative regions, concludes that Tuscans join the northern Italian cluster, close to the inhabitants of Liguria and Emilia-Romagna. A 2013 study, based on uniparental markers of 884 unrelated individuals from 23 Italian locations, had shown that the structure observed for the paternal lineages in continental Italy and Sicily suggests a shared genetic background between people from Tuscany and Northern Italy from one side, and people from Southern Italy and the Adriatic coast from the other side. The most frequent Y-DNA haplogroups in the group represented by populations from North-Western Italy, including Tuscany and most of the Padana plain, are four R1b-lineages (R-U152*, R-M269*, R-P312* and R-L2*).
