= Nebria lareynii =

Scientific classification
- Kingdom: Animalia
- Phylum: Arthropoda
- Class: Insecta
- Order: Coleoptera
- Suborder: Adephaga
- Family: Carabidae
- Subfamily: Nebriinae
- Tribe: Nebriini
- Genus: Nebria
- Species: N. lareynii

Binomial name
- Nebria lareynii Fairmaire, 1858

Synonyms
- Nebria lareyniei Fairmaire, 1858

Species of beetle

Nebria lareynii is a species in the beetle family Carabidae. It is found on the French island of Corsica.
