= Nebria reymondi =

Scientific classification
- Domain: Eukaryota
- Kingdom: Animalia
- Phylum: Arthropoda
- Class: Insecta
- Order: Coleoptera
- Suborder: Adephaga
- Family: Carabidae
- Genus: Nebria
- Species: N. reymondi

Binomial name
- Nebria reymondi Antoine, 1951

Species of beetle

Nebria reymondi is a species of ground beetle in the Nebriinae subfamily that is endemic to Morocco.
