= Tyrsenian =

Tyrsenian can refer to:

- Tyrsenians
- Tyrsenian languages

== See also ==
- Etruscan (disambiguation) aka Tyrsenian
- Etrurian (disambiguation) aka Tyrsenian
- Tyrrhenian (disambiguation) aka Tyrsenian
