= Nebria eugeniae =

Scientific classification
- Domain: Eukaryota
- Kingdom: Animalia
- Phylum: Arthropoda
- Class: Insecta
- Order: Coleoptera
- Suborder: Adephaga
- Family: Carabidae
- Genus: Nebria
- Species: N. eugeniae

Binomial name
- Nebria eugeniae K. Daniel, 1903

Species of beetle

Nebria eugeniae is a species of ground beetle in the Nebriinae subfamily that is endemic to Bulgaria.
