= Nebria orsinii =

Scientific classification
- Kingdom: Animalia
- Phylum: Arthropoda
- Clade: Pancrustacea
- Class: Insecta
- Order: Coleoptera
- Suborder: Adephaga
- Family: Carabidae
- Genus: Nebria
- Species: N. orsinii

Binomial name
- Nebria orsinii A. Villa & C.B. Villa, 1838

Species of beetle

Nebria orsinii is a species of ground beetle in the Nebriinae subfamily that is endemic to Italy.

== Subspecies ==
The species have 3 subspecies all of which can be found in Italy:

- Nebria orsinii aprutiana Banninger, 1922
- Nebria orsinii comata Ledoux & Roux, 2001
- Nebria orsinii orsinii A. Villa & C.B. Villa, 1838
