= Nebria uluderensis =

Scientific classification
- Kingdom: Animalia
- Phylum: Arthropoda
- Class: Insecta
- Order: Coleoptera
- Suborder: Adephaga
- Family: Carabidae
- Genus: Nebria
- Species: N. uluderensis

Binomial name
- Nebria uluderensis Shilenkov & Heinz, 1984

Species of beetle

Nebria uluderensis is a species of ground beetle from Nebriinae subfamily that is endemic to Turkey.
