= Nebria testacea =

Scientific classification
- Domain: Eukaryota
- Kingdom: Animalia
- Phylum: Arthropoda
- Class: Insecta
- Order: Coleoptera
- Suborder: Adephaga
- Family: Carabidae
- Genus: Nebria
- Species: N. testacea

Binomial name
- Nebria testacea Olivier, 1811

Synonyms
- Nebria heldreichi Schaum, 1856

Species of beetle

Nebria testacea is a species of ground beetle in the Nebriinae subfamily that can be found in Greece and Turkey. It is also common on various European islands, such as Crete, Cyclades, and Dodecanese.
