= Etruscan history =

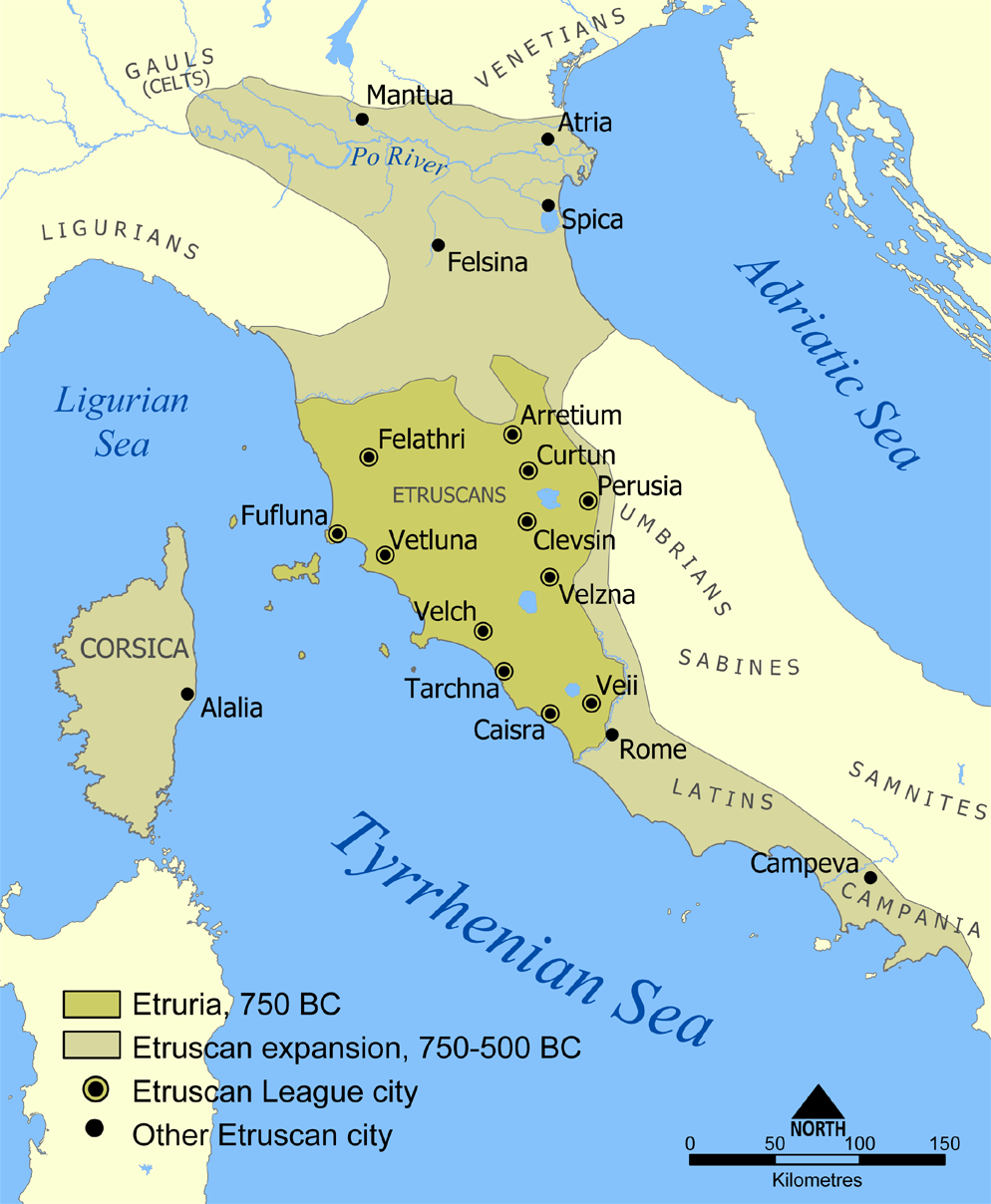
A map showing the extent of Etruria and the Etruscan civilization; the map includes the 12 cities of the Etruscan League and notable cities founded by the Etruscans

Etruscan history is the written record of Etruscan civilization compiled mainly by Greek and Roman authors. Apart from their inscriptions, from which information mainly of a sociological character can be extracted, we do not have any historical works written by the Etruscans themselves, nor is there any mention in the Roman authors that any was ever written. Remnants of Etruscan writings are almost exclusively concerned with religion.

== Origin ==
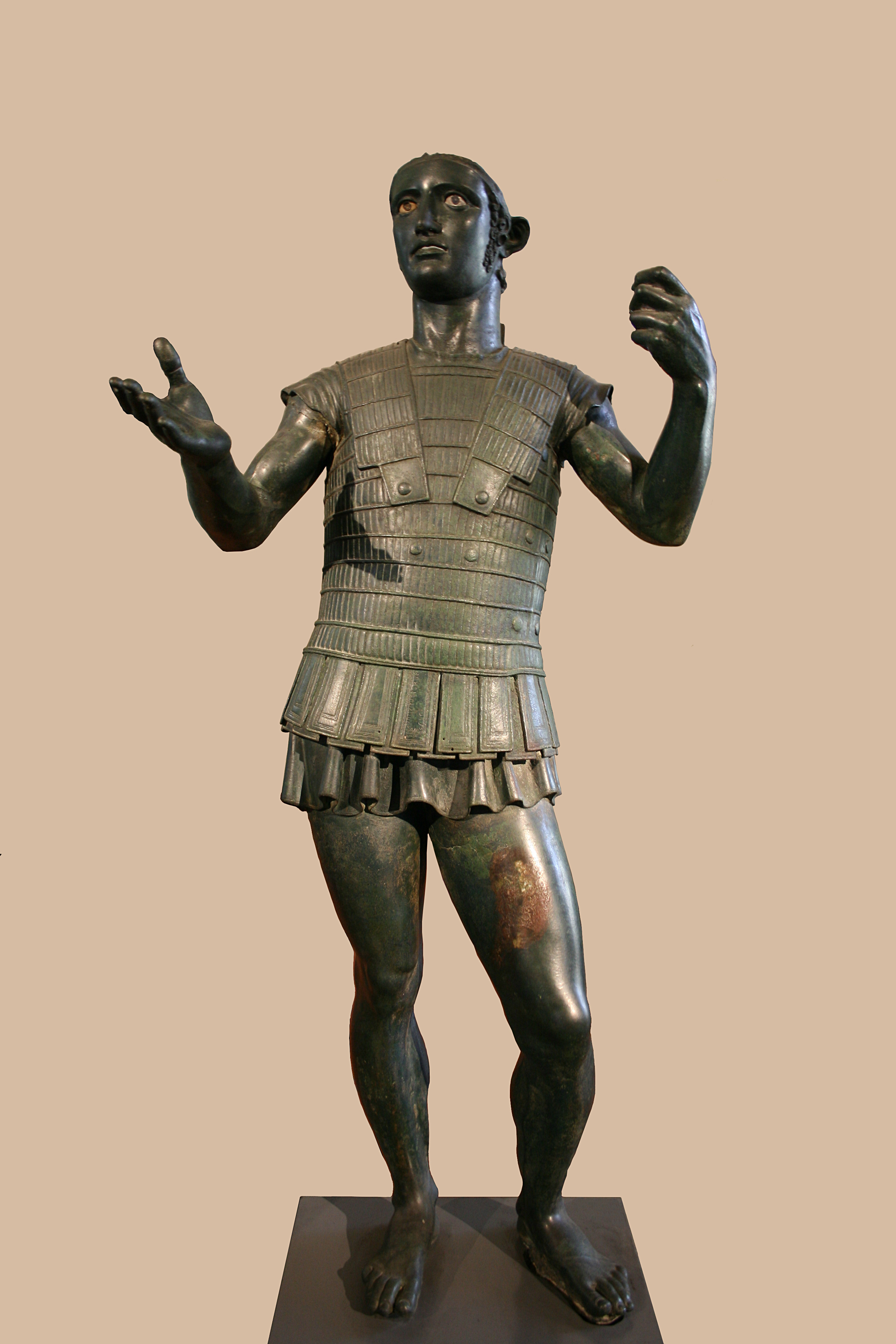
The Mars of Todi, a life-sized bronze sculpture of a soldier making a votive offering, late 5th to early 4th century BC

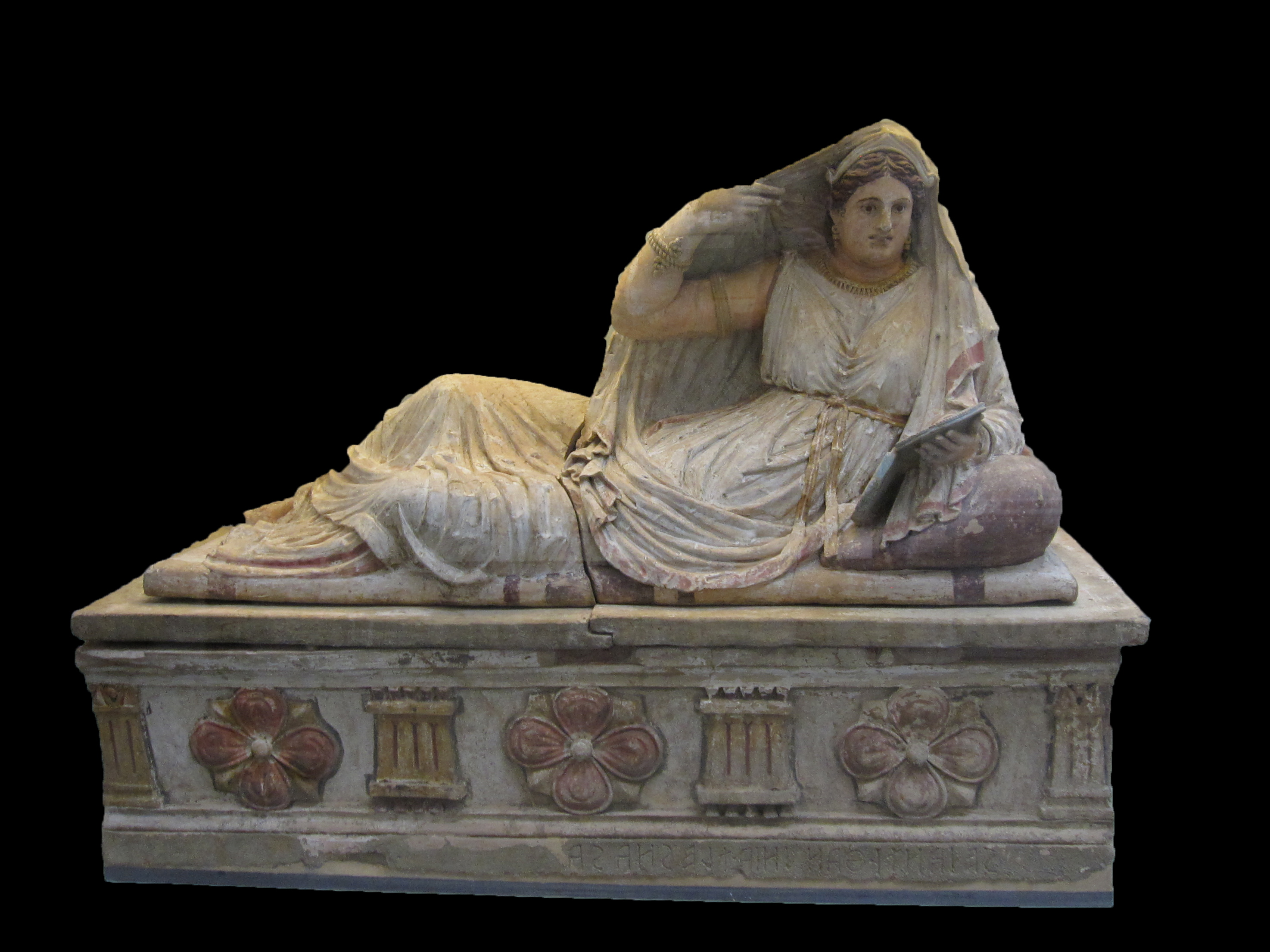
Painted terracotta Sarcophagus of Seianti Hanunia Tlesnasa, about 150–130 BC

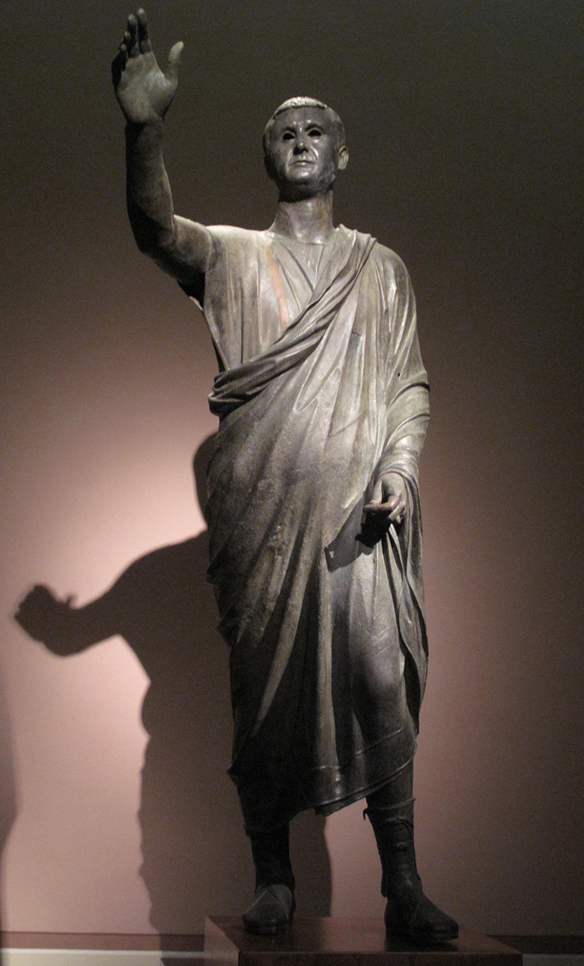
The Orator, c. 100 BC, an Etrusco-Roman bronze statue depicting Aule Metele (Latin: Aulus Metellus), an Etruscan man wearing a Roman toga while engaged in rhetoric; the statue features an inscription in the Etruscan alphabet

There have been three hypotheses as to the origins of the Etruscan civilization in the Early Iron Age: either by autochthonous development in situ out of the Villanovan culture of Etruria in northern and central Italy, or via an eastern (Anatolian or Thessalian) colonization of Italy. The third hypothesis was reported by Livy and Pliny the Elder, and puts the Etruscans in the context of the Rhaetian people to the north and other populations living in the Alps. The first Greek author to mention the Etruscans, whom the Ancient Greeks called Tyrrhenians, was the 8th-century BC poet Hesiod, in his work, the Theogony. He mentioned them as residing in central Italy alongside the Latins. The 7th-century BC Homeric Hymn to Dionysus referred to them as pirates. Unlike later Greek authors, such as Herodotus and Hellanicus, these earlier Greek authors did not suggest that Etruscans had migrated to Italy from elsewhere.

According to prehistoric and protohistoric archaeologists, anthropologists, etruscologists, geneticists, linguists, all the evidence gathered so far fits the autochthonous origin of the Etruscans. Moreover, there is no archeological evidence for a migration of the Lydians or the Pelasgians into Etruria. It was only in the 5th century BC, when the Etruscan civilization had been established for several centuries, that Greek writers started associating the name "Tyrrhenians" with the "Pelasgians" or the "Lydians". There is consensus among modern scholars that these Greek tales are not based on actual events. The earliest evidence of a culture that is identifiably Etruscan dates from about 900 BC: this is the period of the Iron Age Villanovan culture, considered to be the earliest phase of Etruscan civilization, which itself developed from the previous late Bronze Age Proto-Villanovan culture in the same region, part of the central European Urnfield culture system.

Helmut Rix's classification of the Etruscan language in a proposed Tyrsenian language family reflects this ambiguity. He finds Etruscan on one hand genetically related to the Rhaetic language spoken in the Alps north of Etruria, suggesting autochthonous connections, but on the other hand the Lemnian language found on the "Lemnos stele" is closely related to Etruscan, entailing either Etruscan presence in "Tyrsenian" Lemnos, or "Tyrsenian" expansion westward to Etruria. The Etruscan language was of a different family from that of neighbouring Italic and Celtic peoples, who spoke Indo-European languages. The Tyrsenian languages are generally considered Pre-Indo-European and Paleo-European.

== History ==
Etruscan expansion was focused both to the north beyond the Apennines and south into Campania. Some small towns disappeared during the 6th century BC, ostensibly consumed by greater, more powerful neighbors. However, there is no doubt that the political structure of the Etruscan culture was similar, albeit more aristocratic, to Magna Graecia in the south.

The mining and commerce of metal, especially copper and iron, led to an enrichment of the Etruscans and to the expansion of their influence in the Italian peninsula and the western Mediterranean sea. Here, their interests collided with those of the Greeks, especially in the 6th century BC, when Phoceans of Italy founded colonies along the coast of France, Catalonia and Corsica. This led the Etruscans to ally themselves with the Carthaginians, whose interests also collided with the Greeks.

=== Military history ===
Around 540 BC, the Battle of Alalia led to a new distribution of power in the western Mediterranean Sea. Though the battle had no clear winner, Carthage managed to expand its sphere of influence at the expense of both the Etruscans and the Greeks. Etruria saw itself relegated to the northern Tyrrhenian Sea.

From the first half of the 5th century BC, Campanian Etruria lost its Etruscan character, and the new international political situation meant the beginning of the Etruscan decline. In 480 BC, Etruria's ally Carthage was defeated by a coalition of Magna Graecia cities led by Syracuse. A few years later, in 474, Syracuse's tyrant Hiero defeated the Etruscans at the Battle of Cumae. Etruria's influence over the cities of Latium and Campania weakened, and it was taken over by Romans and Samnites.

In the 4th century BC, Padanian Etruria saw a Gallic invasion end its influence over the Po valley and the Adriatic coast.

=== Roman–Etruscan Wars ===
In the 4th century BC, Rome began annexing Etruscan cities. By the beginning of the 1st century BC, Rome had annexed all the remaining Etruscan territory.

== Rulers ==
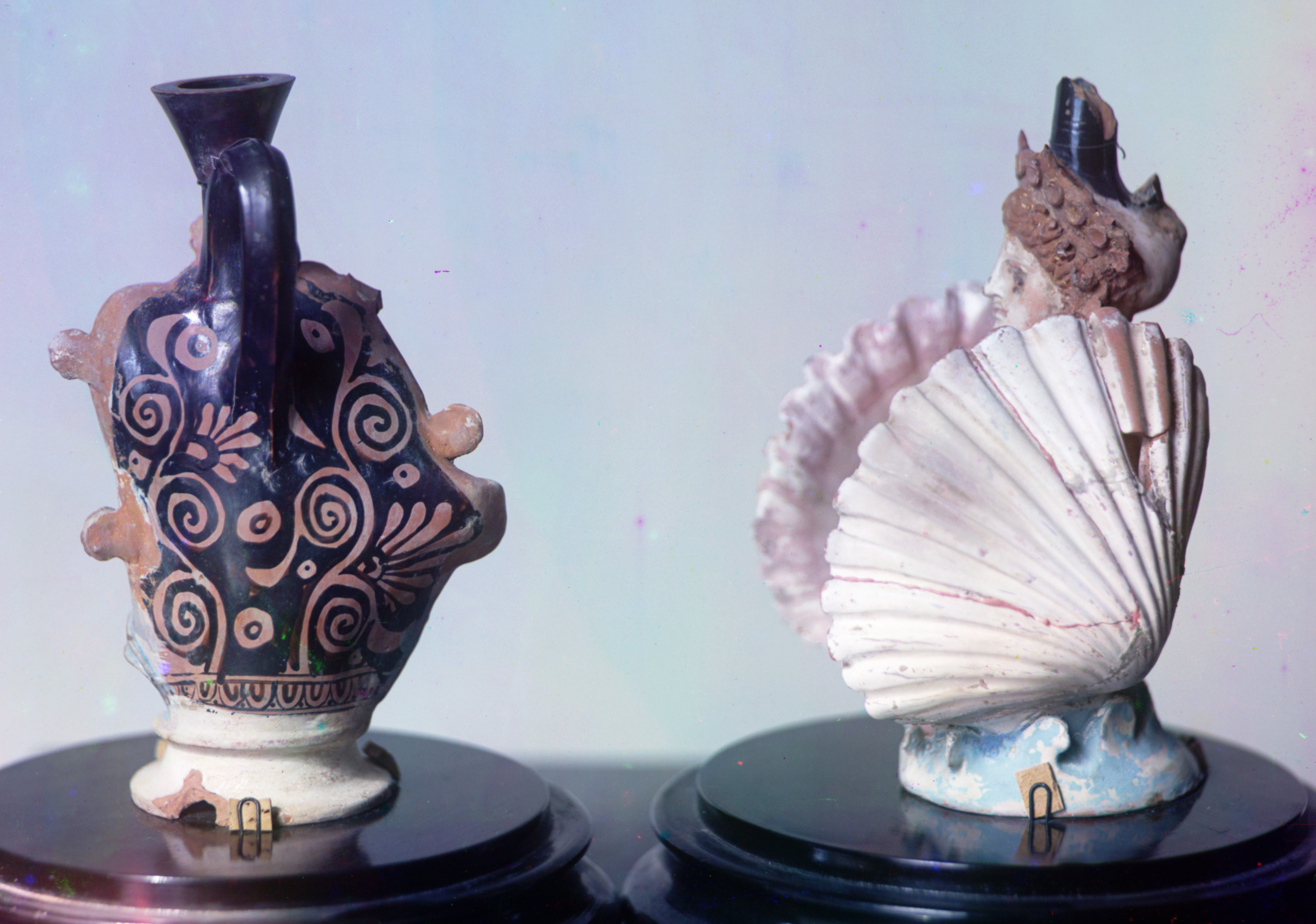
Ancient Etruscan "aryballoi" terracotta vessels unearthed in the 1860s at Bolzhaya Bliznitsa tumulus near Phanagoria, South Russia (then part of the Bosporan Kingdom of Cimmerian Bosporus); on exhibit at the Hermitage Museum in Saint Petersburg.

The institution of kingship was general. Many names of individual Etruscan kings are recorded, most of them in a historical vacuum, but with enough chronological evidence to show that kingship persisted in Etruscan city-culture long after it had been overthrown by the Greeks and at Rome, where Etruscan kings were long remembered with suspicion and scorn. When the last king was appointed, at Veii, the other Etruscan cities were alienated, permitting the Romans to destroy Veii. It is presumed that Etruscan kings were military and religious leaders. The paraphernalia of Etruscan kingship is familiar because it was inherited by Rome; they adopted the symbols of the republican authority wielded by the consuls: the purple robe, the staff or scepter topped with an eagle, the folding cross-framed "curule seat", the sella curulis, and most prominent of all, the fasces carried by a magistrate, which preceded the king in public appearances.

The Etruscan cities would come together under a single leader at a traditional annual council held at the sacred grove of the Fanum Voltumnae. The precise site of this meeting is unknown, but the search has exercised scholars since the Renaissance. In times of no emergency, the position of praetor Etruriae, as Roman inscriptions express it, was no doubt largely ceremonial and concerned with cultus.

=== Rulers of Clevsin (Clusium) ===
- Osiniu fl. probably early 11th century BC
- Lars Porsena fl. late 6th century BC
- Aruns fl. c. 500 BC

=== Rulers of Caisra (Caere) ===
- Lausus
- Larthia
- Thefarie Velianas fl. c. late 6th century–early 4th century BC, known from his temple dedication recorded on the Pyrgi Tablets

=== Rulers of Veii ===
- Volumnius fl. mid 5th century–437 BC
- Lars Tolumnius fl. late 5th century–428 BC

=== Rulers of Arimnus (Ariminum) ===
- Arimnestos

=== Etruscan kings of Rome ===
- Lucius Tarquinius Priscus (616–579)
- Servius Tullius (578–535)
- Lucius Tarquinius Superbus (535–510/509) BC

=== Other Etruscan rulers ===
- Mezentius fl. c. 1100 BC
- Tyrsenos
- Velsu fl. 8th century BC

== See also ==
- Women in the Etruscan society
