= Nebria fulviventris =

Scientific classification
- Domain: Eukaryota
- Kingdom: Animalia
- Phylum: Arthropoda
- Class: Insecta
- Order: Coleoptera
- Suborder: Adephaga
- Family: Carabidae
- Genus: Nebria
- Species: N. fulviventris

Binomial name
- Nebria fulviventris Bassi, 1834

Species of beetle

Nebria fulviventris is a species of ground beetle in the Nebriinae subfamily that is endemic to Italy.
