= Etruscan =

Etruscan may refer to:

== Ancient civilization ==
- Etruscan civilization (1st millennium BC) and related things:
  - Etruscan language
  - Etruscan alphabet
  - Etruscan architecture
  - Etruscan art
  - Etruscan cities
  - Etruscan coins
  - Etruscan history
  - Etruscan mythology
  - Etruscan numerals
  - Etruscan origins
  - Etruscan society
  - Etruscan terracotta warriors

== Biological taxa ==
- Etruscan bear (Ursus etruscus, extinct)
- Etruscan honeysuckle (Lonicera etrusca)
- Etruscan shrew (Suncus etruscus, white-toothed pygmy shrew)

== Other uses ==
- The Etruscan, a novel
- Etruscan Press, a publisher
- Etruscan Resources, a mining company

== See also ==
- Etrurian (disambiguation)
- Toscano (disambiguation)
- Tuscan (disambiguation)
- Tuscany (disambiguation)
