= Sarcophagus of Seianti Hanunia Tlesnasa =

2nd century BC sarcophagus

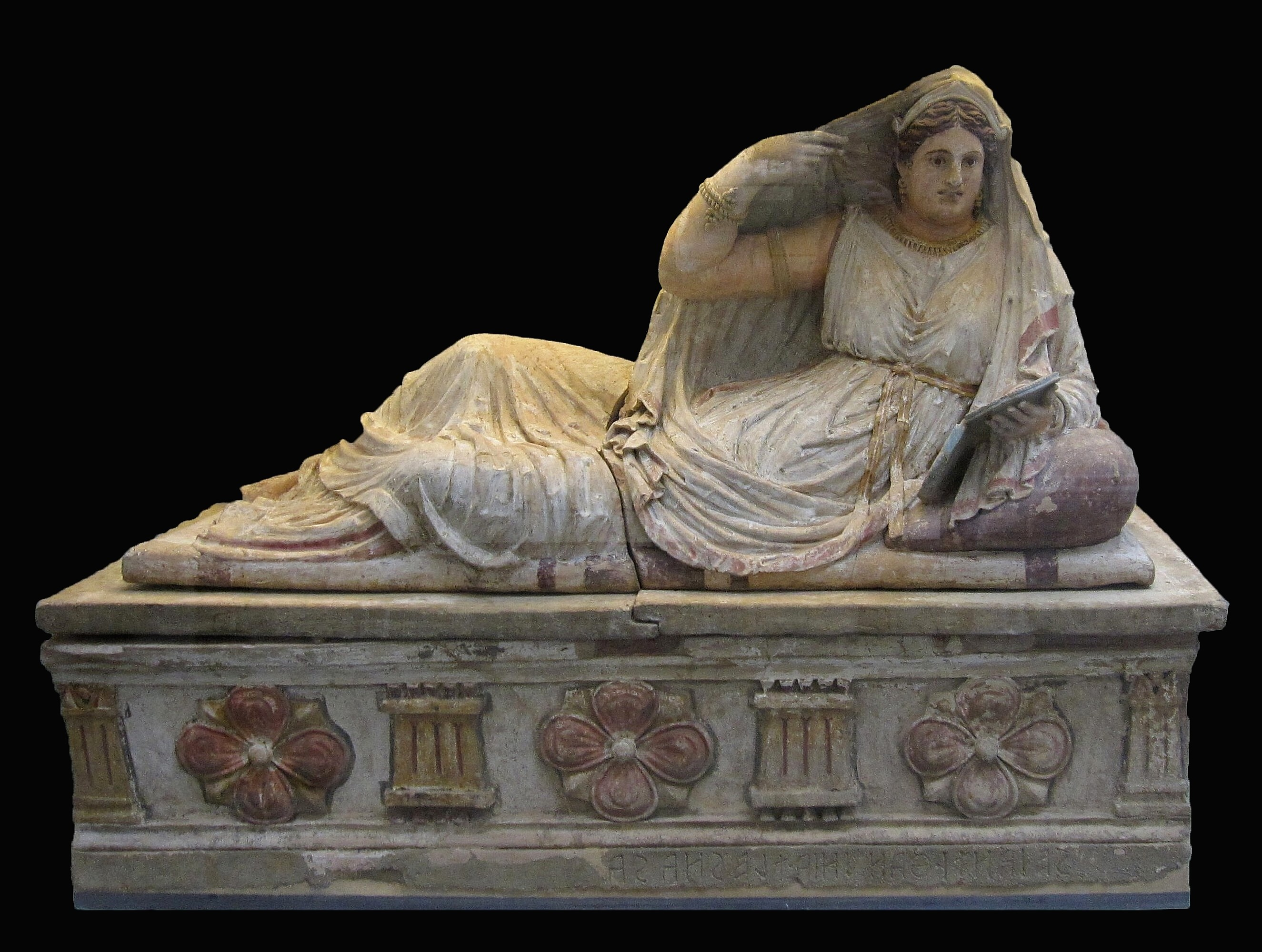
- Sarcophagus of Seianti Hanunia Tlesnasa
- Material: Terracotta
- Size: Length 1.83 m
- Created: 150–140 BC
- Present location: British Museum, London
- Registration: GR 1887.4-2.1 (Terracotta D 786)

The Sarcophagus of Seianti Hanunia Tlesnasa is the life-size sarcophagus of an Etruscan noblewoman dating from between 150–140 BC. It was acquired by the British Museum in 1887.

== Discovery ==
The brightly painted sarcophagus of the Etruscan aristocratic woman Seianti was discovered in 1886 at Poggio Cantarello near Chiusi in Tuscany and was subsequently sold, along with its contents (a skeleton and some grave belongings), to the British Museum. A similar sarcophagus is in the collections of the National Archaeological Museum in Florence. Known as the Sarcophagus of Larthia Seianti, the two women were probably from the same dynastic family in ancient Chiusi.

== Description ==
The sarcophagus is a masterpiece of Etruscan artwork. The deceased woman's name is inscribed in Etruscan along the base of the chest. She must have belonged to one of the richest families of Chiusi, as Seianti is dressed sumptuously for the occasion, wearing an ornate gown and cloak, with complicated drapery falling sinuously over her body, and adorned with a tiara, earrings, bracelets and a necklace. Seianti has been depicted as a mature lady, who gestures to adjust her veil, realistically revealing parts of her body in the process. She leans against a pillow and holds a mirror in her other hand, gazing into the distance.

== Scientific analysis ==
Scientific analysis of the bones and teeth that were deposited in the chest indicated that Seianti probably died at about 50–55 years of age. The youthful appearance of the deceased woman depicted on the sarcophagus, which was typical of Etruscan art at the time, can be compared with a reconstruction of her more mature face in the museum, based on the features of the deceased woman's skull.

== Gallery ==
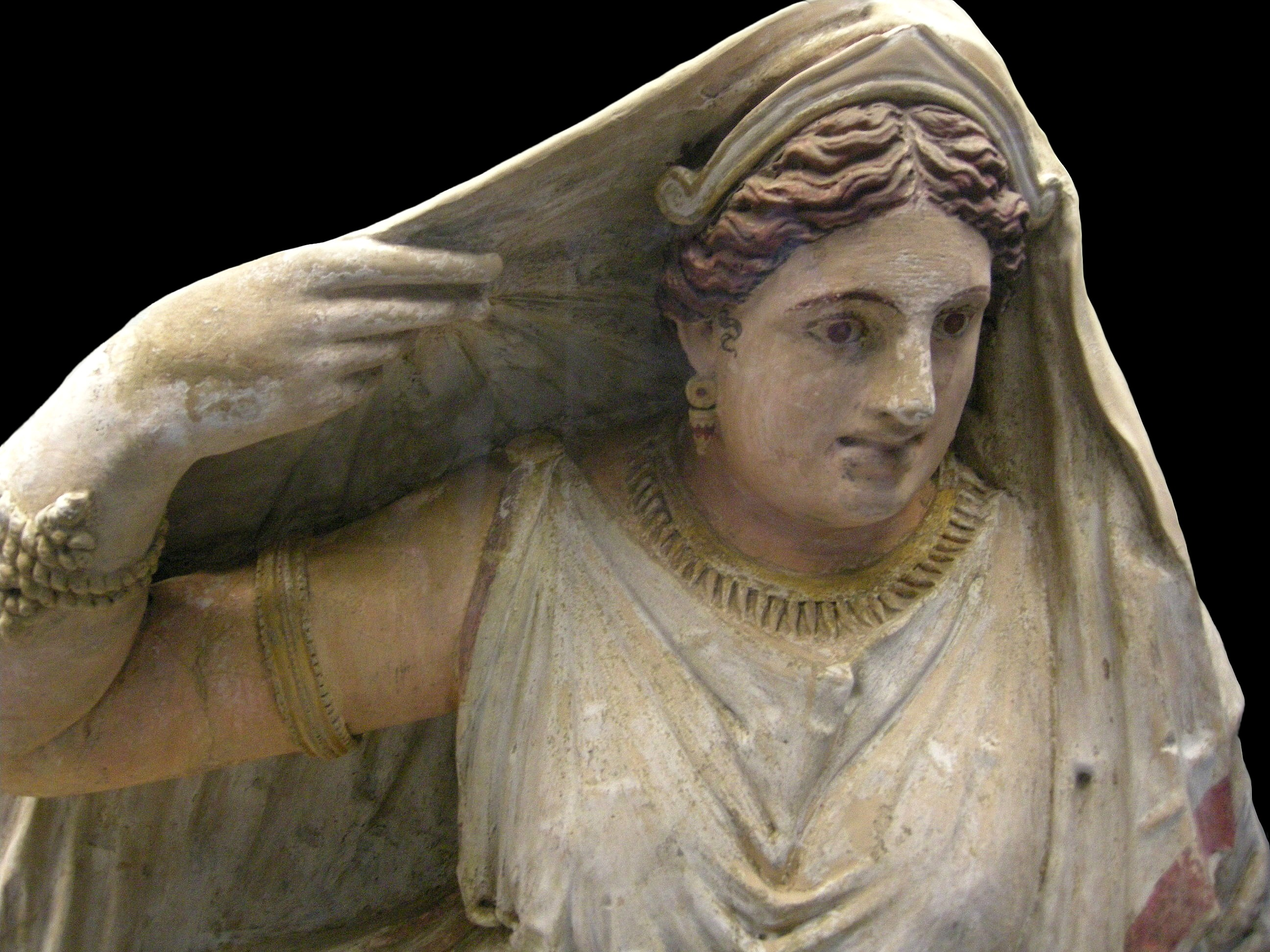
Detail of Seianti Hanunia Tlesnasa

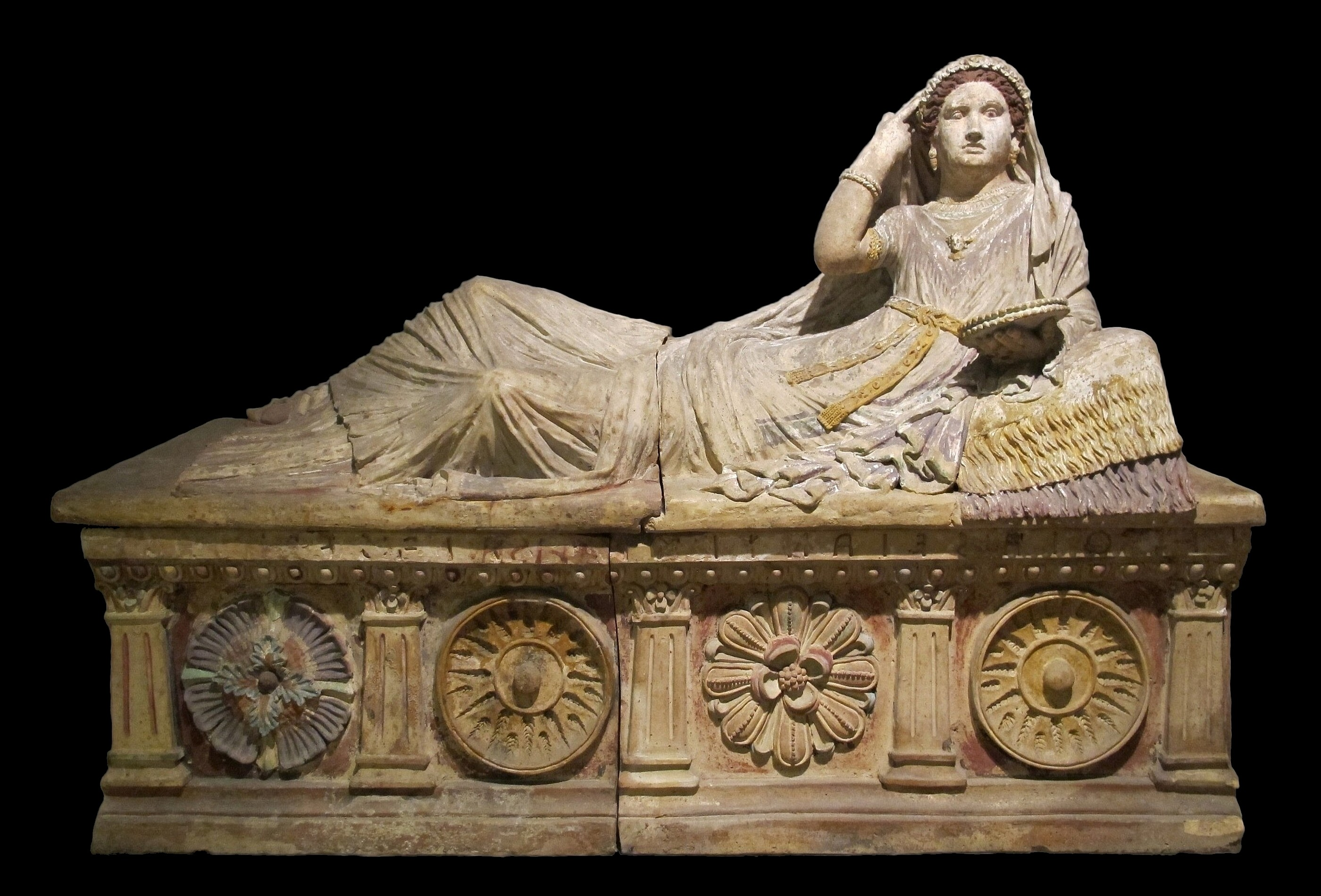
Full length view of Sarcophagus of Larthia Seianti

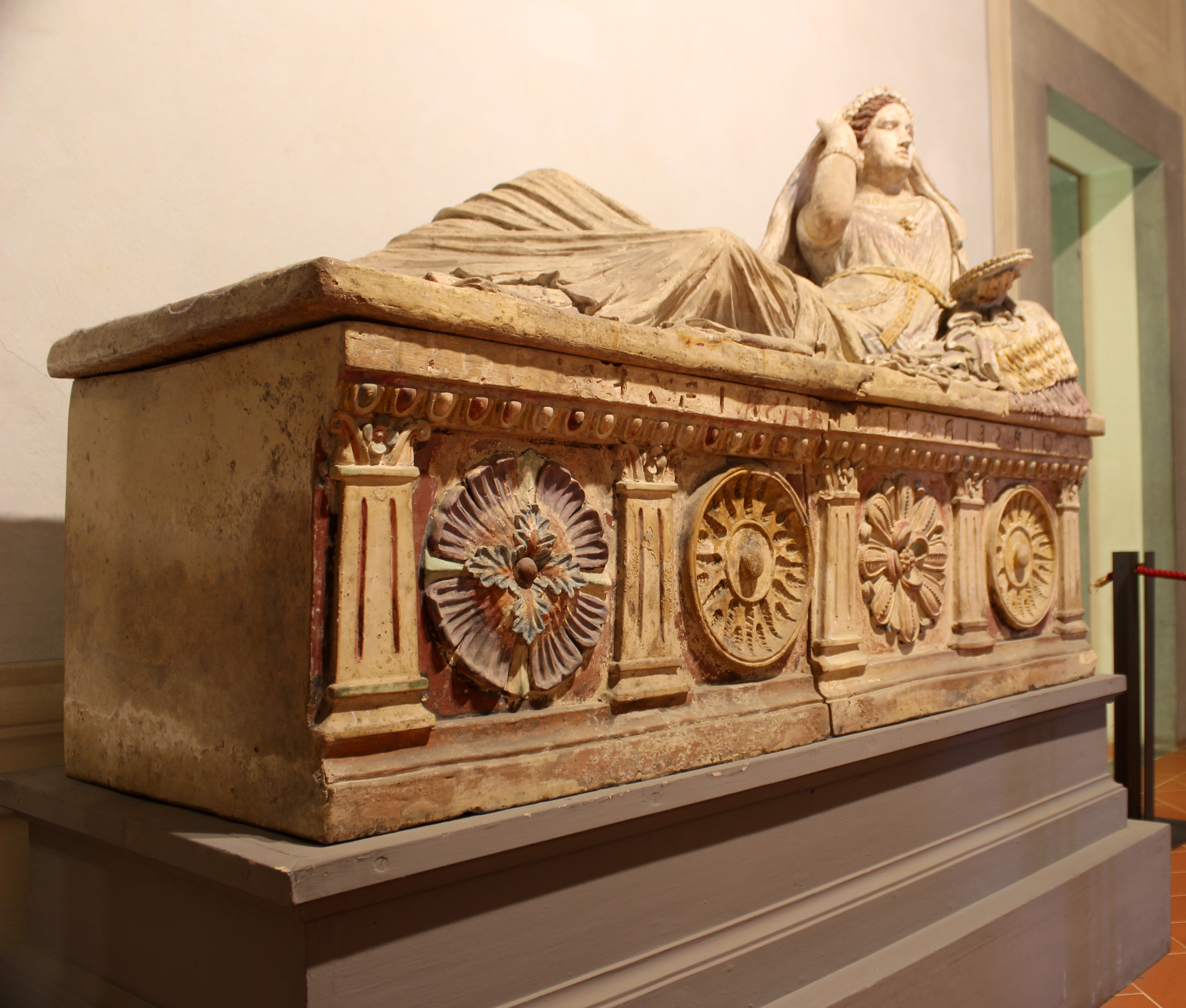
Sarcophagus of Larthia Seianti in Florence

== See also ==
- Sarcophagus of the Spouses

== Bibliography ==
- O. Brendel, Etruscan Art, Pelican History of Art (Yale University Press, 1995)
- L. Burn, The British Museum Book of Greek and Roman Art (British Museum Press, 1991)
- E. Macnamara, Everyday Life of the Etruscans (Barsford/Putnams, 1973)
- E. Macnamara, The Etruscans (London, The British Museum Press, 1990)
- J. Prag and R. Neave, Making Faces: Using Forensic and Archaeoligical Evidence (London, The British Museum Press, 1997)
- J. Swaddling and J. Prag (eds), Seianti Hanunia Tlesnasa. The Story of an Etruscan Noblewoman (British Museum Occasional Paper no.100, 2002, 2nd edition 2006, Trustees of the British Museum)
