= Conrad Quensel =

Swedish naturalist

Conrad Quensel (10 December 1767 – 22 August 1806) was a Swedish naturalist.

== Biography ==
Quensel was born at Åsbo in Skåne, Sweden. He was the son of Jakob Quensel (1724–1802) and Ulrika Benedikta Billberg (1739–1806). His father was a rector at Malmö and later senior clerk in the parish of Ausås. He was named after his grandfather, noted astronomer Conrad Quensel (1676–1732).

In 1789, Quensel became a student at the University of Lund and gained his Magisterexamen in philosophy in 1787. In 1789 he undertook a study trip to Lapland, where he described several new species of insects. Starting from 1791, he was an employee of the Botanic Garden at the University of Uppsala. In 1797 he became a Doctor of Medicine and after 1798 he became Director of the Natural Cabinet (Naturkabinetts) at the Royal Swedish Academy of Sciences in Stockholm. Later he became a chemistry and natural history teacher at the Military Academy Karlberg, where he received in 1805 the title of professor.

Quensel wrote the largest part of the text of the first four volumes of the book Svensk Botanik (1802–1843) with copper plates by Johan Wilhelm Palmstruch (1770–1811). He also wrote the text of the first volume of Svensk Zoologi (1806–1809) and parts of Genera et species curculionidum, cum synonymia hujus familiae, specie novae aut hactenus minus cognitae, descriptionibus a dom. Leonardo Gyllenhal, C. H. Boheman; et entomologis aliis illustratae by Carl Johan Schönherr (1772–1848).

Conrad Quensel died at age 38 at Karlberg Palace in Solna.
