= Dyschirius aeneo =

Scientific classification
- Kingdom: Animalia
- Phylum: Arthropoda
- Class: Insecta
- Order: Coleoptera
- Suborder: Adephaga
- Family: Carabidae
- Genus: Dyschirius
- Species: D. aeneo

Binomial name
- Dyschirius aeneo Boheman, 1849

Species of beetle

Dyschirius aeneo is a species of ground beetle in the subfamily Scaritinae. It was described by Boheman in 1849.
