= Dyschirius asper =

Scientific classification
- Domain: Eukaryota
- Kingdom: Animalia
- Phylum: Arthropoda
- Class: Insecta
- Order: Coleoptera
- Suborder: Adephaga
- Family: Carabidae
- Genus: Dyschirius
- Species: D. asper

Binomial name
- Dyschirius asper Andrewes, 1929

Species of beetle

Dyschirius asper is a species of ground beetle in the subfamily Scaritinae. It was described by Andrewes in 1929.
