= Dyschirius kryzhanovskii =

Scientific classification
- Domain: Eukaryota
- Kingdom: Animalia
- Phylum: Arthropoda
- Class: Insecta
- Order: Coleoptera
- Suborder: Adephaga
- Family: Carabidae
- Genus: Dyschirius
- Species: D. kryzhanovskii

Binomial name
- Dyschirius kryzhanovskii Gryuntal, 1984

Species of beetle

Dyschirius kryzhanovskii is a species of ground beetle in the subfamily Scaritinae. It was described by Gryuntal in 1984.
