= Dyschirius hessei =

Scientific classification
- Domain: Eukaryota
- Kingdom: Animalia
- Phylum: Arthropoda
- Class: Insecta
- Order: Coleoptera
- Suborder: Adephaga
- Family: Carabidae
- Subfamily: Scaritinae
- Tribe: Dyschiriini
- Genus: Dyschirius
- Species: D. hessei

Binomial name
- Dyschirius hessei Kult, 1954

Synonyms
- Dyschirius hassei

Species of beetle

Dyschirius hessei is a species in the beetle family Carabidae. It is found in Saudi Arabia and Yemen.
