= Dyschirius rufipes =

Scientific classification
- Kingdom: Animalia
- Phylum: Arthropoda
- Clade: Pancrustacea
- Class: Insecta
- Order: Coleoptera
- Suborder: Adephaga
- Family: Carabidae
- Genus: Dyschirius
- Species: D. rufipes

Binomial name
- Dyschirius rufipes (Dejean, 1825)

Species of beetle

Dyschirius rufipes is a species of ground beetle in the subfamily Scaritinae. It was described by Pierre François Marie Auguste Dejean in 1825.
