= Dyschirius crenulatus =

Scientific classification
- Domain: Eukaryota
- Kingdom: Animalia
- Phylum: Arthropoda
- Class: Insecta
- Order: Coleoptera
- Suborder: Adephaga
- Family: Carabidae
- Genus: Dyschirius
- Species: D. crenulatus

Binomial name
- Dyschirius crenulatus Putzeys, 1866

Species of beetle

Dyschirius crenulatus is a species of ground beetle in the subfamily Scaritinae. It was described by Jules Putzeys in 1866.
