= Dyschirius edentulus =

Scientific classification
- Domain: Eukaryota
- Kingdom: Animalia
- Phylum: Arthropoda
- Class: Insecta
- Order: Coleoptera
- Suborder: Adephaga
- Family: Carabidae
- Genus: Dyschirius
- Species: D. edentulus

Binomial name
- Dyschirius edentulus Putzeys, 1846

Species of beetle

Dyschirius edentulus is a species of ground beetle in the subfamily Scaritinae. It was described by Putzeys in 1846.
