= Dyschirius baenningeri =

Scientific classification
- Domain: Eukaryota
- Kingdom: Animalia
- Phylum: Arthropoda
- Class: Insecta
- Order: Coleoptera
- Suborder: Adephaga
- Family: Carabidae
- Genus: Dyschirius
- Species: D. baenningeri

Binomial name
- Dyschirius baenningeri (Fedorenko, 2004)

Species of beetle

Dyschirius baenningeri is a species of ground beetle in the subfamily Scaritinae. It was described by Fedorenko in 2004.
