= Dyschirius sonamargensis =

Scientific classification
- Kingdom: Animalia
- Phylum: Arthropoda
- Class: Insecta
- Order: Coleoptera
- Suborder: Adephaga
- Family: Carabidae
- Genus: Dyschirius
- Species: D. sonamargensis

Binomial name
- Dyschirius sonamargensis Balkenohl, 1994

Species of beetle

Dyschirius sonamargensis is a species of ground beetle in the subfamily Scaritinae. It was described by Balkenohl in 1994.
