= Dyschirius guatemalenus =

Scientific classification
- Domain: Eukaryota
- Kingdom: Animalia
- Phylum: Arthropoda
- Class: Insecta
- Order: Coleoptera
- Suborder: Adephaga
- Family: Carabidae
- Genus: Dyschirius
- Species: D. guatemalenus

Binomial name
- Dyschirius guatemalenus H. W. Bates, 1881

Species of beetle

Dyschirius guatemalenus is a species of ground beetle in the subfamily Scaritinae. It was described by Henry Walter Bates in 1881.
