= Dyschirius arcanus =

Scientific classification
- Domain: Eukaryota
- Kingdom: Animalia
- Phylum: Arthropoda
- Class: Insecta
- Order: Coleoptera
- Suborder: Adephaga
- Family: Carabidae
- Genus: Dyschirius
- Species: D. arcanus

Binomial name
- Dyschirius arcanus Bruneau de Miré, 1952

Species of beetle

Dyschirius arcanus is a species of ground beetle in the subfamily Scaritinae. It was described by Bruneau de Mire in 1952.
