= Dyschirius fusus =

Scientific classification
- Domain: Eukaryota
- Kingdom: Animalia
- Phylum: Arthropoda
- Class: Insecta
- Order: Coleoptera
- Suborder: Adephaga
- Family: Carabidae
- Genus: Dyschirius
- Species: D. fusus

Binomial name
- Dyschirius fusus Putzeys, 1878

Species of beetle

Dyschirius fusus is a species of ground beetle in the subfamily Scaritinae. It was described by Jules Putzeys in 1878.
