= Dyschirius mesopotamicus =

Scientific classification
- Domain: Eukaryota
- Kingdom: Animalia
- Phylum: Arthropoda
- Class: Insecta
- Order: Coleoptera
- Suborder: Adephaga
- Family: Carabidae
- Genus: Dyschirius
- Species: D. mesopotamicus

Binomial name
- Dyschirius mesopotamicus Jos. Müller, 1922

Species of beetle

Dyschirius mesopotamicus is a species of ground beetle in the subfamily Scaritinae. It was described by J. Muller in 1922.
