= Dyschirius matisi =

Scientific classification
- Domain: Eukaryota
- Kingdom: Animalia
- Phylum: Arthropoda
- Class: Insecta
- Order: Coleoptera
- Suborder: Adephaga
- Family: Carabidae
- Genus: Dyschirius
- Species: D. matisi

Binomial name
- Dyschirius matisi Lafer, 1989

Species of beetle

Dyschirius matisi is a species of ground beetle in the subfamily Scaritinae. It was described by Lafer in 1989.
