= Dyschirius freyi =

Scientific classification
- Domain: Eukaryota
- Kingdom: Animalia
- Phylum: Arthropoda
- Class: Insecta
- Order: Coleoptera
- Suborder: Adephaga
- Family: Carabidae
- Genus: Dyschirius
- Species: D. freyi

Binomial name
- Dyschirius freyi A. Jedlička, 1958

Species of beetle

Dyschirius freyi is a species of ground beetle in a subfamily Scaritinae. It was described by Jedlicka in 1958.
