= Dyschirius neresheimeri =

Scientific classification
- Domain: Eukaryota
- Kingdom: Animalia
- Phylum: Arthropoda
- Class: Insecta
- Order: Coleoptera
- Suborder: Adephaga
- Family: Carabidae
- Genus: Dyschirius
- Species: D. neresheimeri

Binomial name
- Dyschirius neresheimeri H. Wagner, 1915

Species of beetle

Dyschirius neresheimeri is a species of ground beetle in the subfamily Scaritinae. It was described by Wagner in 1915.
