= Dyschirius aida =

Scientific classification
- Domain: Eukaryota
- Kingdom: Animalia
- Phylum: Arthropoda
- Class: Insecta
- Order: Coleoptera
- Suborder: Adephaga
- Family: Carabidae
- Genus: Dyschirius
- Species: D. aida

Binomial name
- Dyschirius aida Schatzmayr, 1936

Species of beetle

Dyschirius aida is a species of ground beetle in the subfamily Scaritinae. It was described by Schatzmayr in 1936.
