= Dyschirius lambertoni =

Scientific classification
- Domain: Eukaryota
- Kingdom: Animalia
- Phylum: Arthropoda
- Class: Insecta
- Order: Coleoptera
- Suborder: Adephaga
- Family: Carabidae
- Genus: Dyschirius
- Species: D. lambertoni

Binomial name
- Dyschirius lambertoni Vuillet, 1910

Species of beetle

Dyschirius lambertoni is a species of ground beetle in the subfamily Scaritinae. It was described by Vuillet in 1910.
