= Dyschirius unipunctatus =

Scientific classification
- Domain: Eukaryota
- Kingdom: Animalia
- Phylum: Arthropoda
- Class: Insecta
- Order: Coleoptera
- Suborder: Adephaga
- Family: Carabidae
- Genus: Dyschirius
- Species: D. unipunctatus

Binomial name
- Dyschirius unipunctatus Fall, 1901

Species of beetle

Dyschirius unipunctatus is a species of ground beetle in the subfamily Scaritinae. It was described by Fall in 1901.
