= Dyschirius perversus =

Scientific classification
- Domain: Eukaryota
- Kingdom: Animalia
- Phylum: Arthropoda
- Class: Insecta
- Order: Coleoptera
- Suborder: Adephaga
- Family: Carabidae
- Genus: Dyschirius
- Species: D. perversus

Binomial name
- Dyschirius perversus Fall, 1922

Species of beetle

Dyschirius perversus is a species of ground beetle in the subfamily Scaritinae. It was described by Henry Clinton Fall in 1922.
