= Dyschirius beludsha =

Scientific classification
- Domain: Eukaryota
- Kingdom: Animalia
- Phylum: Arthropoda
- Class: Insecta
- Order: Coleoptera
- Suborder: Adephaga
- Family: Carabidae
- Subfamily: Scaritinae
- Tribe: Dyschiriini
- Genus: Dyschirius
- Species: D. beludsha

Binomial name
- Dyschirius beludsha Tschitscherine, 1904

Synonyms
- Dyschirius beludscha

Species of beetle

Dyschirius beludsha is a species of ground beetle in the subfamily Scaritinae. It is found in North Africa, the Middle East, and southern Asia.
