= Dyschirius hiemalis =

Scientific classification
- Domain: Eukaryota
- Kingdom: Animalia
- Phylum: Arthropoda
- Class: Insecta
- Order: Coleoptera
- Suborder: Adephaga
- Family: Carabidae
- Genus: Dyschirius
- Species: D. hiemalis

Binomial name
- Dyschirius hiemalis Bousquet, 1987

Species of beetle

Dyschirius hiemalis is a species of ground beetle in the family Carabidae. It is found in North America.
