= Dyschirius assegaaicus =

Scientific classification
- Domain: Eukaryota
- Kingdom: Animalia
- Phylum: Arthropoda
- Class: Insecta
- Order: Coleoptera
- Suborder: Adephaga
- Family: Carabidae
- Genus: Dyschirius
- Species: D. assegaaicus

Binomial name
- Dyschirius assegaaicus (Fedorenko, 2000)

Species of beetle

Dyschirius assegaaicus is a species of ground beetle in the subfamily Scaritinae. It was described by Fedorenko in 2000.
