= Dyschirius hipponensis =

Scientific classification
- Kingdom: Animalia
- Phylum: Arthropoda
- Class: Insecta
- Order: Coleoptera
- Suborder: Adephaga
- Family: Carabidae
- Genus: Dyschirius
- Species: D. hipponensis

Binomial name
- Dyschirius hipponensis Pic, 1894

Species of beetle

Dyschirius hipponensis is a species of ground beetle in the subfamily Scaritinae. It was described by Pic in 1894.
