= Dyschirius milloti =

Scientific classification
- Domain: Eukaryota
- Kingdom: Animalia
- Phylum: Arthropoda
- Class: Insecta
- Order: Coleoptera
- Suborder: Adephaga
- Family: Carabidae
- Genus: Dyschirius
- Species: D. milloti

Binomial name
- Dyschirius milloti Jeannel, 1949

Species of beetle

Dyschirius milloti is a species of ground beetle in the subfamily Scaritinae. It was described by Jeannel in 1949.
