= Dyschirius cariniceps =

Scientific classification
- Kingdom: Animalia
- Phylum: Arthropoda
- Clade: Pancrustacea
- Class: Insecta
- Order: Coleoptera
- Suborder: Adephaga
- Family: Carabidae
- Genus: Dyschirius
- Species: D. cariniceps

Binomial name
- Dyschirius cariniceps Baudi di Selve, 1864

Species of beetle

Dyschirius cariniceps is a species of ground beetle in the subfamily Scaritinae. It was described by Baudi di Selve in 1864. The species is found in Cyprus
