= Dyschirius marani =

Scientific classification
- Kingdom: Animalia
- Phylum: Arthropoda
- Clade: Pancrustacea
- Class: Insecta
- Order: Coleoptera
- Suborder: Adephaga
- Family: Carabidae
- Genus: Dyschirius
- Species: D. marani

Binomial name
- Dyschirius marani Kult, 1949

Species of beetle

Dyschirius marani is a species of ground beetle in the subfamily Scaritinae. It was described by Kult in 1949. It is from Southeast Asia.
