= Dyschirius sevanensis =

Scientific classification
- Domain: Eukaryota
- Kingdom: Animalia
- Phylum: Arthropoda
- Class: Insecta
- Order: Coleoptera
- Suborder: Adephaga
- Family: Carabidae
- Genus: Dyschirius
- Species: D. sevanensis

Binomial name
- Dyschirius sevanensis Iablokoff-Khnzorian, 1962

Species of beetle

Dyschirius sevanensis is a species of ground beetle in the subfamily Scaritinae. It was described by Iablokoff-Khnzorian in 1962.
