= Dyschirius tristis =

Scientific classification
- Domain: Eukaryota
- Kingdom: Animalia
- Phylum: Arthropoda
- Class: Insecta
- Order: Coleoptera
- Suborder: Adephaga
- Family: Carabidae
- Genus: Dyschirius
- Species: D. tristis

Binomial name
- Dyschirius tristis J. F. Stephens, 1827

Species of beetle

Dyschirius tristis is a species of ground beetle in the subfamily Scaritinae. It was described by Stephens in 1827.
