= Dyschirius franzi =

Scientific classification
- Domain: Eukaryota
- Kingdom: Animalia
- Phylum: Arthropoda
- Class: Insecta
- Order: Coleoptera
- Suborder: Adephaga
- Family: Carabidae
- Genus: Dyschirius
- Species: D. franzi

Binomial name
- Dyschirius franzi Kult, 1954

Species of beetle

Dyschirius franzi is a species of ground beetle in the subfamily Scaritinae. It was described by Kult in 1954.
