= Dyschirius dostali =

Scientific classification
- Domain: Eukaryota
- Kingdom: Animalia
- Phylum: Arthropoda
- Class: Insecta
- Order: Coleoptera
- Suborder: Adephaga
- Family: Carabidae
- Genus: Dyschirius
- Species: D. dostali

Binomial name
- Dyschirius dostali (Bulirsch & Fedorenko, 2007)

Species of beetle

Dyschirius dostali is a species of ground beetle in the subfamily Scaritinae. It was described by Bulirsch & Fedorenko in 2007.
