= Dyschirius fleischeri =

Scientific classification
- Domain: Eukaryota
- Kingdom: Animalia
- Phylum: Arthropoda
- Class: Insecta
- Order: Coleoptera
- Suborder: Adephaga
- Family: Carabidae
- Genus: Dyschirius
- Species: D. fleischeri

Binomial name
- Dyschirius fleischeri Sainte-Claire Deville, 1904

Species of beetle

Dyschirius fleischeri is a species of ground beetle in the subfamily Scaritinae. It was described by Deville in 1904.
