= Dyschirius katanganus =

Scientific classification
- Kingdom: Animalia
- Phylum: Arthropoda
- Clade: Pancrustacea
- Class: Insecta
- Order: Coleoptera
- Suborder: Adephaga
- Family: Carabidae
- Genus: Dyschirius
- Species: D. katanganus

Binomial name
- Dyschirius katanganus Burgeon, 1935

Species of beetle

Dyschirius katanganus is a species of ground beetle in the subfamily Scaritinae. It was described by Burgeon in 1935.
