= Dyschirius afghanus =

Scientific classification
- Domain: Eukaryota
- Kingdom: Animalia
- Phylum: Arthropoda
- Class: Insecta
- Order: Coleoptera
- Suborder: Adephaga
- Family: Carabidae
- Genus: Dyschirius
- Species: D. afghanus

Binomial name
- Dyschirius afghanus A. Jedlička, 1967

Species of beetle

Dyschirius afghanus is a species of ground beetle in the subfamily Scaritinae. It was described by Jedlicka in 1967.
