= Dyschirius bruchi =

Scientific classification
- Domain: Eukaryota
- Kingdom: Animalia
- Phylum: Arthropoda
- Class: Insecta
- Order: Coleoptera
- Suborder: Adephaga
- Family: Carabidae
- Genus: Dyschirius
- Species: D. bruchi

Binomial name
- Dyschirius bruchi (Kult, 1950)

Species of beetle

Dyschirius bruchi is a species of ground beetle in the subfamily Scaritinae. It was described by Kult in 1950.
