= Dyschirius patruelis =

Scientific classification
- Domain: Eukaryota
- Kingdom: Animalia
- Phylum: Arthropoda
- Class: Insecta
- Order: Coleoptera
- Suborder: Adephaga
- Family: Carabidae
- Genus: Dyschirius
- Species: D. patruelis

Binomial name
- Dyschirius patruelis LeConte, 1852

Species of beetle

Dyschirius patruelis is a species of ground beetle in the subfamily Scaritinae. It was described by John Lawrence LeConte in 1852.
