= Dyschirius impressus =

Scientific classification
- Domain: Eukaryota
- Kingdom: Animalia
- Phylum: Arthropoda
- Class: Insecta
- Order: Coleoptera
- Suborder: Adephaga
- Family: Carabidae
- Subfamily: Scaritinae
- Tribe: Dyschiriini
- Genus: Dyschirius
- Species: D. impressus

Binomial name
- Dyschirius impressus Putzeys, 1846

Synonyms
- Dyschirius subcylindricus (Motschulsky, 1849)

Species of beetle

Dyschirius impressus is a species in the beetle family Carabidae. It is found in Portugal and Mediterranean countries.
