= Dyschirius substriatus =

Scientific classification
- Domain: Eukaryota
- Kingdom: Animalia
- Phylum: Arthropoda
- Class: Insecta
- Order: Coleoptera
- Suborder: Adephaga
- Family: Carabidae
- Genus: Dyschirius
- Species: D. substriatus

Binomial name
- Dyschirius substriatus (Duftschmid, 1812)

Species of beetle

Dyschirius substriatus is a species of ground beetle in the subfamily Scaritinae. It was described by Duftschmid in 1812.
