= Dyschirius auriculatus =

Scientific classification
- Domain: Eukaryota
- Kingdom: Animalia
- Phylum: Arthropoda
- Class: Insecta
- Order: Coleoptera
- Suborder: Adephaga
- Family: Carabidae
- Genus: Dyschirius
- Species: D. auriculatus

Binomial name
- Dyschirius auriculatus Wollaston, 1867

Species of beetle

Dyschirius auriculatus is a species of ground beetle in the subfamily Scaritinae. It was described by Thomas Vernon Wollaston in 1867.
