= Dyschirius carri =

Scientific classification
- Domain: Eukaryota
- Kingdom: Animalia
- Phylum: Arthropoda
- Class: Insecta
- Order: Coleoptera
- Suborder: Adephaga
- Family: Carabidae
- Genus: Dyschirius
- Species: D. carri

Binomial name
- Dyschirius carri Bousquet, 1996

Species of beetle

Dyschirius carri is a species of ground beetle in the subfamily Scaritinae. It was described by Bousquet in 1996.
