= Dyschirius arcifer =

Scientific classification
- Kingdom: Animalia
- Phylum: Arthropoda
- Class: Insecta
- Order: Coleoptera
- Suborder: Adephaga
- Family: Carabidae
- Genus: Dyschirius
- Species: D. arcifer

Binomial name
- Dyschirius arcifer Znojko, 1928

Species of beetle

Dyschirius arcifer is a species of ground beetle in the subfamily Scaritinae. It was described by Russian entomologist Dmitry Vasilyevich Znojko in 1928.
