= Dyschirius montanus =

Scientific classification
- Domain: Eukaryota
- Kingdom: Animalia
- Phylum: Arthropoda
- Class: Insecta
- Order: Coleoptera
- Suborder: Adephaga
- Family: Carabidae
- Genus: Dyschirius
- Species: D. montanus

Binomial name
- Dyschirius montanus LeConte, 1879

Species of beetle

Dyschirius montanus is a species of ground beetle in the subfamily Scaritinae. It was described by John Lawrence LeConte in 1879.
