= Dyschirius pallipennis =

Scientific classification
- Domain: Eukaryota
- Kingdom: Animalia
- Phylum: Arthropoda
- Class: Insecta
- Order: Coleoptera
- Suborder: Adephaga
- Family: Carabidae
- Genus: Dyschirius
- Species: D. pallipennis

Binomial name
- Dyschirius pallipennis (Say, 1823)

Species of beetle

Dyschirius pallipennis is a species of ground beetle in the subfamily Scaritinae. It was described by Say in 1823.
