= Dyschirius crinifer =

Scientific classification
- Kingdom: Animalia
- Phylum: Arthropoda
- Class: Insecta
- Order: Coleoptera
- Suborder: Adephaga
- Family: Carabidae
- Genus: Dyschirius
- Species: D. crinifer

Binomial name
- Dyschirius crinifer Balkenohl, 1993

Species of beetle

Dyschirius crinifer is a species of ground beetle in the subfamily Scaritinae. It was described by Balkenohl in 1993.
