= Dyschirius alajensis =

Scientific classification
- Domain: Eukaryota
- Kingdom: Animalia
- Phylum: Arthropoda
- Class: Insecta
- Order: Coleoptera
- Suborder: Adephaga
- Family: Carabidae
- Genus: Dyschirius
- Species: D. alajensis

Binomial name
- Dyschirius alajensis Znojko, 1930

Species of beetle

Dyschirius alajensis is a species of ground beetle in the subfamily Scaritinae. It was described by Znojko in 1930.
