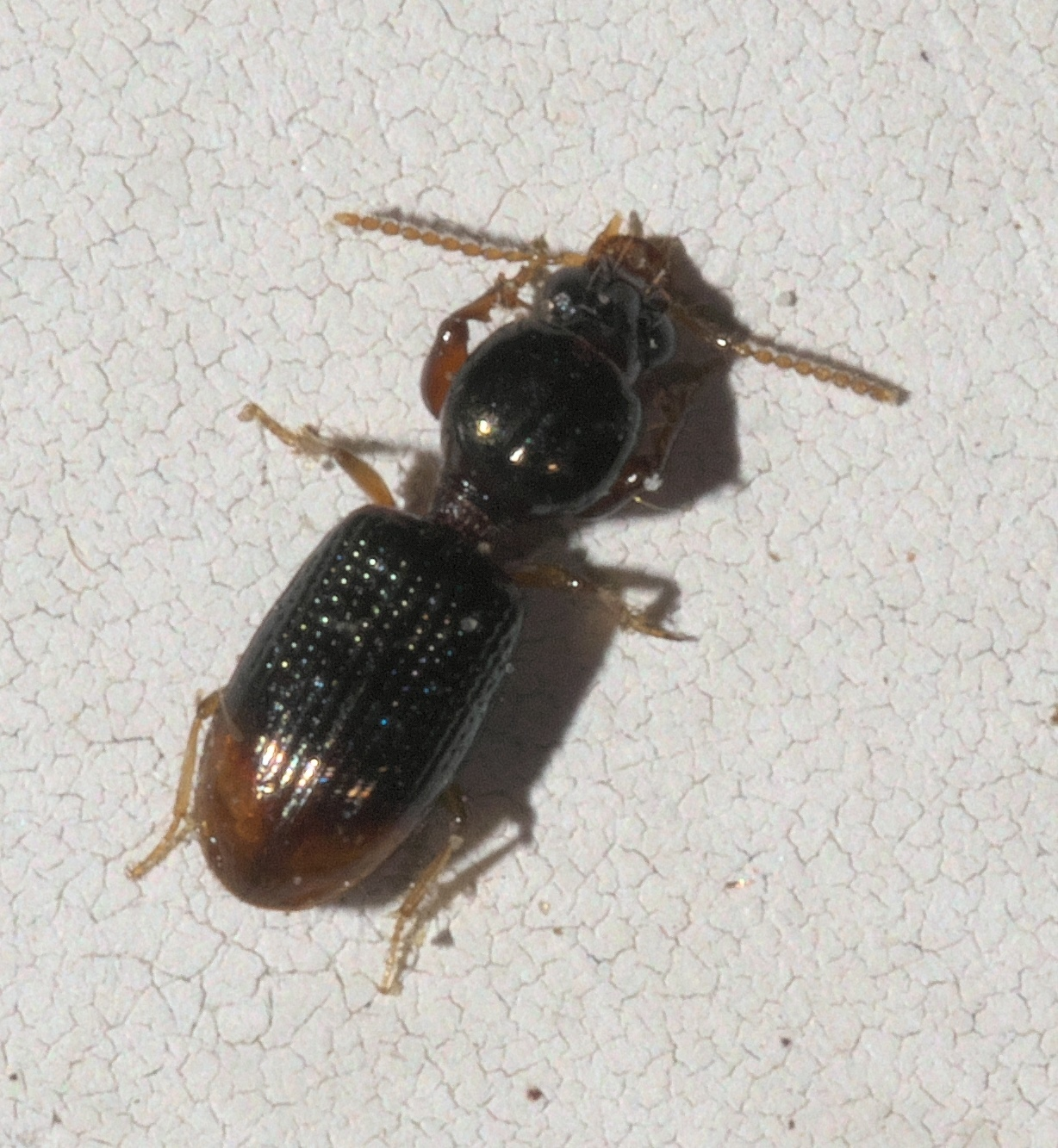
- Dyschirius haemorrhoidalis, Oklahoma

Scientific classification
- Kingdom: Animalia
- Phylum: Arthropoda
- Class: Insecta
- Order: Coleoptera
- Suborder: Adephaga
- Family: Carabidae
- Genus: Dyschirius
- Species: D. haemorrhoidalis

Binomial name
- Dyschirius haemorrhoidalis (Dejean, 1831)

= Dyschirius haemorrhoidalis =

Species of beetle

Dyschirius haemorrhoidalis is a species of ground beetle in the subfamily Scaritinae, found in North America. It was described by Pierre François Marie Auguste Dejean in 1831.
