= Dyschirius chalceus =

Scientific classification
- Domain: Eukaryota
- Kingdom: Animalia
- Phylum: Arthropoda
- Class: Insecta
- Order: Coleoptera
- Suborder: Adephaga
- Family: Carabidae
- Genus: Dyschirius
- Species: D. chalceus

Binomial name
- Dyschirius chalceus Erichson, 1837

Species of beetle

Dyschirius chalceus is a species of ground beetle in the subfamily Scaritinae. It was described by Wilhelm Ferdinand Erichson in 1837.
