= Dyschirius amphibolus =

Scientific classification
- Domain: Eukaryota
- Kingdom: Animalia
- Phylum: Arthropoda
- Class: Insecta
- Order: Coleoptera
- Suborder: Adephaga
- Family: Carabidae
- Genus: Dyschirius
- Species: D. amphibolus

Binomial name
- Dyschirius amphibolus Jos. Müller, 1922

Species of beetle

Dyschirius amphibolus is a species of ground beetle in the subfamily Scaritinae. It was described by J. Muller in 1922.
