= Dyschirius breviphthalmus =

Scientific classification
- Kingdom: Animalia
- Phylum: Arthropoda
- Class: Insecta
- Order: Coleoptera
- Suborder: Adephaga
- Family: Carabidae
- Genus: Dyschirius
- Species: D. breviphthalmus

Binomial name
- Dyschirius breviphthalmus Balkenohl & Lompe, 2003

Species of beetle

Dyschirius breviphthalmus is a species of ground beetle in the subfamily Scaritinae. It was described by Balkenohl & Lompe in 2003.
