= Dyschirius jelineki =

Scientific classification
- Domain: Eukaryota
- Kingdom: Animalia
- Phylum: Arthropoda
- Class: Insecta
- Order: Coleoptera
- Suborder: Adephaga
- Family: Carabidae
- Genus: Dyschirius
- Species: D. jelineki

Binomial name
- Dyschirius jelineki Bulirsch, 2009

Species of beetle

Dyschirius jelineki is a species of ground beetle in the subfamily Scaritinae. It was described by Bulirsch in 2009.
