= Dyschirius peyrierasi =

Scientific classification
- Domain: Eukaryota
- Kingdom: Animalia
- Phylum: Arthropoda
- Class: Insecta
- Order: Coleoptera
- Suborder: Adephaga
- Family: Carabidae
- Genus: Dyschirius
- Species: D. peyrierasi

Binomial name
- Dyschirius peyrierasi Basilewsky, 1976

Species of beetle

Dyschirius peyrierasi is a species of ground beetle in the subfamily Scaritinae. It was described by Pierre Basilewsky in 1976.
