= Dyschirius fulgidus =

Scientific classification
- Domain: Eukaryota
- Kingdom: Animalia
- Phylum: Arthropoda
- Class: Insecta
- Order: Coleoptera
- Suborder: Adephaga
- Family: Carabidae
- Genus: Dyschirius
- Species: D. fulgidus

Binomial name
- Dyschirius fulgidus Motschulsky, 1850

Species of beetle

Dyschirius fulgidus is a species of ground beetle in the subfamily Scaritinae. It was described by Victor Motschulsky in 1850.
