= Dyschirius lgockii =

Scientific classification
- Domain: Eukaryota
- Kingdom: Animalia
- Phylum: Arthropoda
- Class: Insecta
- Order: Coleoptera
- Suborder: Adephaga
- Family: Carabidae
- Genus: Dyschirius
- Species: D. lgockii

Binomial name
- Dyschirius lgockii Fleischer, 1912

Species of beetle

Dyschirius lgockii is a species of ground beetle in the subfamily Scaritinae. It was described by A. Fleischer in 1912.
