= Dyschirius luticola =

Scientific classification
- Domain: Eukaryota
- Kingdom: Animalia
- Phylum: Arthropoda
- Class: Insecta
- Order: Coleoptera
- Suborder: Adephaga
- Family: Carabidae
- Genus: Dyschirius
- Species: D. luticola

Binomial name
- Dyschirius luticola Chaudoir, 1850

Species of beetle

Dyschirius luticola is a species of ground beetle in the subfamily Scaritinae. It was described by Maximilien Chaudoir in 1850.
