= Dyschirius gracilis =

Scientific classification
- Domain: Eukaryota
- Kingdom: Animalia
- Phylum: Arthropoda
- Class: Insecta
- Order: Coleoptera
- Suborder: Adephaga
- Family: Carabidae
- Genus: Dyschirius
- Species: D. gracilis

Binomial name
- Dyschirius gracilis (Heer, 1837)

Species of beetle

Dyschirius gracilis is a species of ground beetle in the subfamily Scaritinae. It was described by Heer in 1837.
