= Dyschirius digitatus =

Scientific classification
- Kingdom: Animalia
- Phylum: Arthropoda
- Class: Insecta
- Order: Coleoptera
- Suborder: Adephaga
- Family: Carabidae
- Genus: Dyschirius
- Species: D. digitatus

Binomial name
- Dyschirius digitatus (Dejean, 1825)

Species of beetle

Dyschirius digitatus is a species of ground beetle in the subfamily Scaritinae. It was described by Pierre François Marie Auguste Dejean in 1825.
