= Dyschirius laevifasciatus =

Scientific classification
- Domain: Eukaryota
- Kingdom: Animalia
- Phylum: Arthropoda
- Class: Insecta
- Order: Coleoptera
- Suborder: Adephaga
- Family: Carabidae
- Genus: Dyschirius
- Species: D. laevifasciatus

Binomial name
- Dyschirius laevifasciatus G. H. Horn, 1878

Species of beetle

Dyschirius laevifasciatus is a species of ground beetle in the subfamily Scaritinae. It was described by G. Horn in 1878.
