= Dyschirius exochus =

Scientific classification
- Domain: Eukaryota
- Kingdom: Animalia
- Phylum: Arthropoda
- Class: Insecta
- Order: Coleoptera
- Suborder: Adephaga
- Family: Carabidae
- Genus: Dyschirius
- Species: D. exochus

Binomial name
- Dyschirius exochus D. R. Whitehead, 1970

Species of beetle

Dyschirius exochus is a species of ground beetle in the subfamily Scaritinae. It was described by Whitehead in 1970.
