= Dyschirius varidens =

Scientific classification
- Domain: Eukaryota
- Kingdom: Animalia
- Phylum: Arthropoda
- Class: Insecta
- Order: Coleoptera
- Suborder: Adephaga
- Family: Carabidae
- Genus: Dyschirius
- Species: D. varidens

Binomial name
- Dyschirius varidens Fall, 1910

Species of beetle

Dyschirius varidens is a species of ground beetle in the subfamily Scaritinae. It was described by Fall in 1910.
