= Dyschirius dejeanii =

Scientific classification
- Domain: Eukaryota
- Kingdom: Animalia
- Phylum: Arthropoda
- Class: Insecta
- Order: Coleoptera
- Suborder: Adephaga
- Family: Carabidae
- Genus: Dyschirius
- Species: D. dejeanii

Binomial name
- Dyschirius dejeanii Putzeys, 1846

Species of beetle

Dyschirius dejeanii is a species of ground beetle in the subfamily Scaritinae. It was described by Jules Putzeys in 1846. Found in North America, it is also known as Dejean’s Discolored Beetle.
