= Dyschirius fabbrii =

Scientific classification
- Domain: Eukaryota
- Kingdom: Animalia
- Phylum: Arthropoda
- Class: Insecta
- Order: Coleoptera
- Suborder: Adephaga
- Family: Carabidae
- Genus: Dyschirius
- Species: D. fabbrii

Binomial name
- Dyschirius fabbrii (Bulirsch & Magrini, 2006)

Species of beetle

Dyschirius fabbrii is a species of ground beetle in the subfamily Scaritinae. It was described by Bulirsch & Magrini in 2006.
