= Dyschirius parvulus =

Scientific classification
- Kingdom: Animalia
- Phylum: Arthropoda
- Class: Insecta
- Order: Coleoptera
- Suborder: Adephaga
- Family: Carabidae
- Genus: Dyschirius
- Species: D. parvulus

Binomial name
- Dyschirius parvulus Péringuey, 1896

Species of beetle

Dyschirius parvulus is a species of ground beetle in the subfamily Scaritinae. It was described by Peringuey in 1896.
