= Dyschirius filiformis =

Scientific classification
- Domain: Eukaryota
- Kingdom: Animalia
- Phylum: Arthropoda
- Class: Insecta
- Order: Coleoptera
- Suborder: Adephaga
- Family: Carabidae
- Genus: Dyschirius
- Species: D. filiformis

Binomial name
- Dyschirius filiformis LeConte, 1857

Species of beetle

Dyschirius filiformis is a species of ground beetle in the subfamily Scaritinae. It was described by John Lawrence LeConte in 1857.
