= Dyschirius changlingensis =

Scientific classification
- Domain: Eukaryota
- Kingdom: Animalia
- Phylum: Arthropoda
- Class: Insecta
- Order: Coleoptera
- Suborder: Adephaga
- Family: Carabidae
- Genus: Dyschirius
- Species: D. changlingensis

Binomial name
- Dyschirius changlingensis Li, 1992

Species of beetle

Dyschirius changlingensis is a species of ground beetle in the subfamily Scaritinae. It was described by Li in 1992 (Probably the Chinese entomologist Jing-Ke Li who published a book on the coleopterans of NE China in 1992.).
