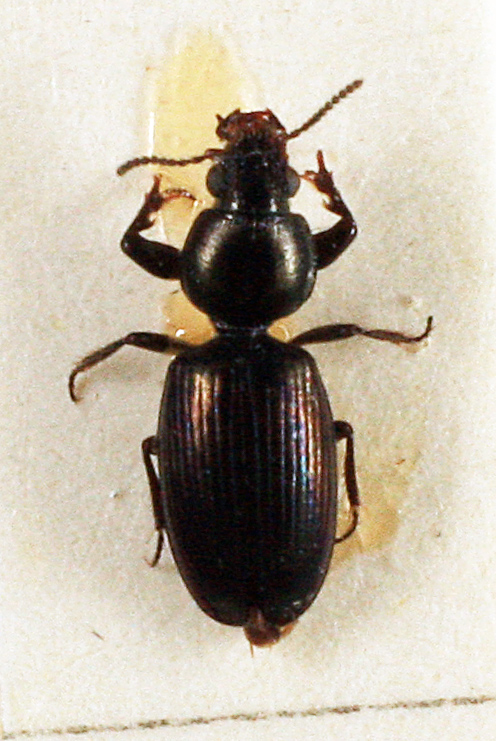
- Dyschirius obscurus

Scientific classification
- Kingdom: Animalia
- Phylum: Arthropoda
- Clade: Pancrustacea
- Class: Insecta
- Order: Coleoptera
- Suborder: Adephaga
- Family: Carabidae
- Subfamily: Scaritinae
- Tribe: Dyschiriini
- Genus: Dyschirius; Bonelli, 1810

= Dyschirius =

Genus of beetles

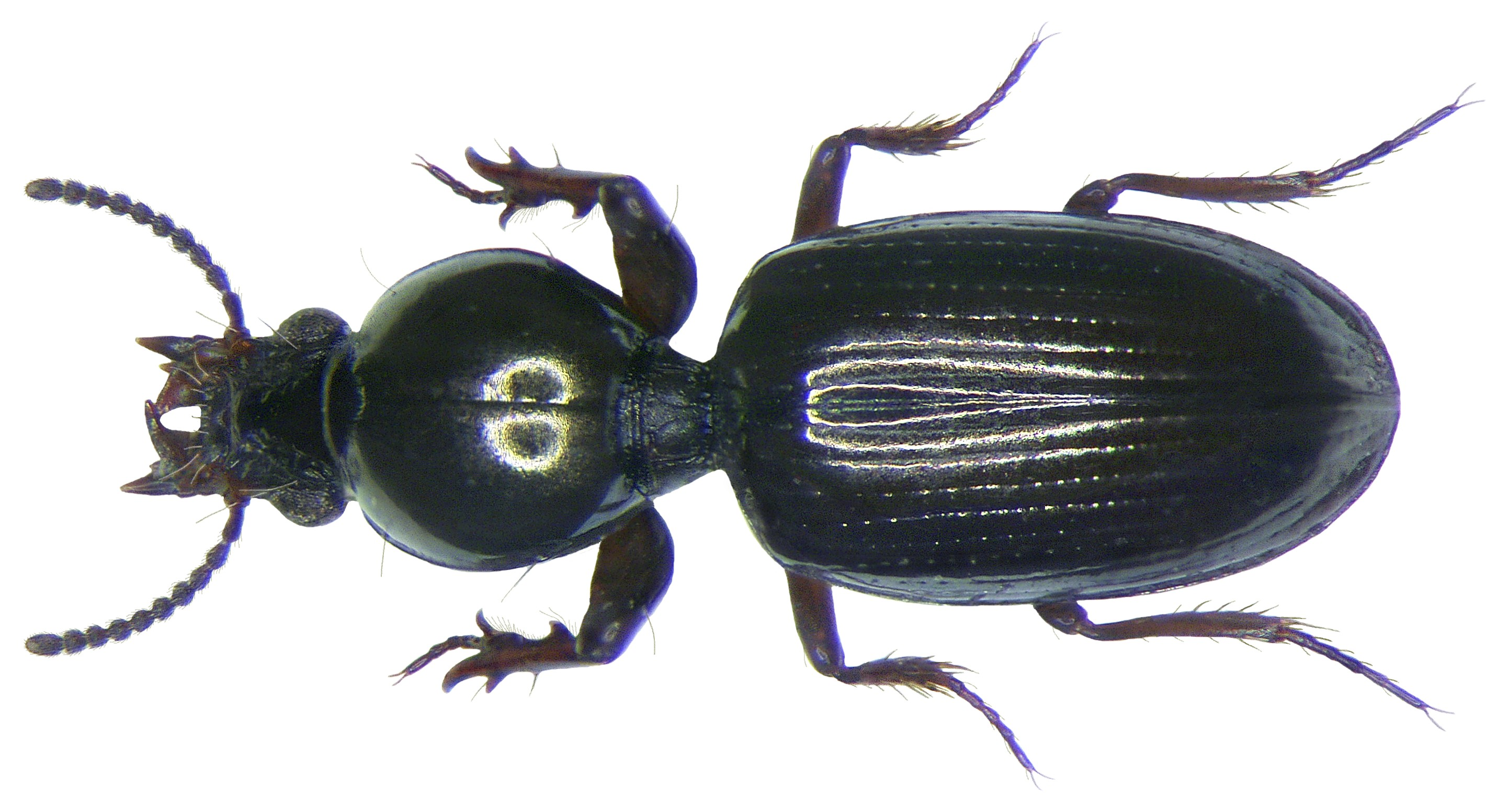
Dyschirius thoracicus

Dyschirius is a genus of beetles in the family Carabidae:

== Species ==
This is a list of the species in Dyschirius:

- Dyschirius abbreviatus Putzeys, 1846
- Dyschirius abditus Fedorenko, 1993
- Dyschirius addisabeba (Bulirsch, 2006)
- Dyschirius aeneolus LeConte, 1850
- Dyschirius aeneus (Dejean, 1825)
- Dyschirius affinis Fall, 1901
- Dyschirius afghanus A. Jedlička, 1967
- Dyschirius agnatus Motschulsky, 1844
- Dyschirius aida Schatzmayr, 1936
- Dyschirius alajensis Znojko, 1930
- Dyschirius alticola Lindroth, 1961
- Dyschirius amazonicus Fedorenko, 1991
- Dyschirius ambiguus Fedorenko, 1994
- Dyschirius amphibolus Jos. Müller, 1922
- Dyschirius amurensis Fedorenko, 1991
- Dyschirius analis Leconte, 1852
- Dyschirius angolensis (Fedorenko, 2000)
- Dyschirius angustatus (Ahrens, 1830)
- Dyschirius angusticollis Putzeys, 1867
- Dyschirius anichtchenkoi (Bulirsch, 2015)
- Dyschirius antoinei Puel, 1925
- Dyschirius apicalis Putzeys, 1846
- Dyschirius aratus Leconte, 1852
- Dyschirius arcanus Bruneau de Miré, 1952
- Dyschirius arcifer Znojko, 1928
- Dyschirius armatus Wollaston, 1864
- Dyschirius arnoldii Gryuntal, 1984
- Dyschirius asper Andrewes, 1929
- Dyschirius assegaaicus (Fedorenko, 2000)
- Dyschirius auriculatus Wollaston, 1867
- Dyschirius bacillus Schaum, 1857
- Dyschirius baehri (Bulirsch, 2006)
- Dyschirius baenningeri (Fedorenko, 2004)
- Dyschirius baicalensis Motschulsky, 1844
- Dyschirius baudoni Antoine, 1952
- Dyschirius bechynei Kult, 1949
- Dyschirius becvari (Bulirsch, 2006)
- Dyschirius beludsha Tschitscherine, 1904
- Dyschirius bengalensis Andrewes, 1929
- Dyschirius beydagensis Jeanne, 1996
- Dyschirius bifrons Andrewes, 1929
- Dyschirius binodosus Putzeys, 1878
- Dyschirius boliviensis (Bulirsch, 2015)
- Dyschirius bonellii Putzeys, 1846
- Dyschirius bousqueti (Bulirsch, 2006)
- Dyschirius braziliensis Fedorenko, 1999
- Dyschirius breviphthalmus Balkenohl & Lompe, 2003
- Dyschirius brevispinus Leconte, 1878
- Dyschirius bruchi (Kult, 1950)
- Dyschirius bryanti (Kult, 1950)
- Dyschirius buglanensis Bulirsch, 1996
- Dyschirius campicola Lindroth, 1961
- Dyschirius cariniceps Baudi di Selve, 1864
- Dyschirius carri Bousquet, 1996
- Dyschirius cerberus Larson, 1968
- Dyschirius chalceus Erichson, 1837
- Dyschirius chalybeus Putzeys, 1846
- Dyschirius championi Andrewes, 1929
- Dyschirius changlingensis Li, 1992
- Dyschirius cheloscelis H. W. Bates, 1873
- Dyschirius chiricahuae Dajoz, 2004
- Dyschirius clorinda Bulirsch, 2009
- Dyschirius clypeatus Putzeys, 1867
- Dyschirius comatus Bousquet, 1988
- Dyschirius compactus Lindroth, 1961
- Dyschirius consobrinus Leconte, 1852
- Dyschirius constrictus Andrewes, 1929
- Dyschirius contortus (Fedorenko, 1997)
- Dyschirius crenulatus Putzeys, 1867
- Dyschirius criddlei Fall, 1925
- Dyschirius crinifer Balkenohl, 1993
- Dyschirius curvispinus Putzeys, 1846
- Dyschirius cylindricus (Dejean, 1825)
- Dyschirius darlingtoni Kult, 1950
- Dyschirius darwini (Kult, 1950)
- Dyschirius dejeanii Putzeys, 1846
- Dyschirius devroeyianus Burgeon, 1935
- Dyschirius digitatus (Dejean, 1825)
- Dyschirius dimidiatus Chaudoir, 1846
- Dyschirius disjunctus Andrewes, 1929
- Dyschirius dispar Péringuey, 1896
- Dyschirius dostali (Bulirsch & Fedorenko, 2007)
- Dyschirius ecuadorensis (Bulirsch, 2006)
- Dyschirius edentulus Putzeys, 1846
- Dyschirius eduardinus Burgeon, 1935
- Dyschirius erwini Bulirsch, 2009
- Dyschirius erythrocerus Leconte, 1857
- Dyschirius euphraticus Putzeys, 1846
- Dyschirius euxinus Znojko, 1927
- Dyschirius exaratus Putzeys, 1867
- Dyschirius exochus D. R. Whitehead, 1970
- Dyschirius extensus Putzeys, 1846
- Dyschirius fabbrii (Bulirsch & Magrini, 2006)
- Dyschirius facchinii Bulirsch, 2009
- Dyschirius fassatii Kult, 1949
- Dyschirius fedorenkoi (Bulirsch, 2006)
- Dyschirius ferganensis Znojko, 1930
- Dyschirius ferrugineus Bousquet, 1988
- Dyschirius fianarensis Bulirsch, 2006
- Dyschirius filiformis Leconte, 1857
- Dyschirius flavicornis Péringuey, 1896
- Dyschirius fleischeri Sainte-Claire Deville, 1904
- Dyschirius formosanus Kult, 1949
- Dyschirius fossifrons Putzeys, 1867
- Dyschirius franzi Kult, 1954
- Dyschirius freyi A. Jedlička, 1958
- Dyschirius fulgidus Motschulsky, 1850
- Dyschirius fulvipes (Dejean, 1825)
- Dyschirius fulvus (Fedorenko, 2000)
- Dyschirius fusus Putzeys, 1878
- Dyschirius genieri Bulirsch, 2009
- Dyschirius gerardi Burgeon, 1935
- Dyschirius gibbipennis Leconte, 1857
- Dyschirius girardi Kult, 1949
- Dyschirius globosus Herbst, 1784
- Dyschirius globulosus (Say, 1823)
- Dyschirius gracilis (Heer, 1837)
- Dyschirius guatemalenus H. W. Bates, 1881
- Dyschirius haemorrhoidalis (Dejean, 1831)
- Dyschirius hajeki Bulirsch, 2009
- Dyschirius hessei Kult, 1954
- Dyschirius heydeni Fleischer, 1899
- Dyschirius hiemalis Bousquet, 1987
- Dyschirius himalaicus (Fedorenko, 1997)
- Dyschirius hingstoni Andrewes, 1929
- Dyschirius hiogoensis H. W. Bates, 1873
- Dyschirius hipponensis Pic, 1894
- Dyschirius hoberlandti Kult, 1954
- Dyschirius horaki (Bulirsch, 2017)
- Dyschirius humeratus Chaudoir, 1850
- Dyschirius humiolcus Chaudoir, 1850
- Dyschirius importunoides Jeanne, 1996
- Dyschirius importunus Schaum, 1857
- Dyschirius impressifrons Fedorenko, 1993
- Dyschirius impressus Putzeys, 1846
- Dyschirius impunctipennis J. F. Dawson, 1854
- Dyschirius insularis (Bulirsch & Fedorenko, 2013)
- Dyschirius integer Leconte, 1852
- Dyschirius interior Fall, 1922
- Dyschirius intermedius Putzeys, 1846
- Dyschirius intricatus (Fedorenko, 2000)
- Dyschirius ivanloebli {Balkenohl & Bulirsch, 2018)
- Dyschirius jedlickai Kult, 1940
- Dyschirius jelineki Bulirsch, 2009
- Dyschirius jindrai Fedorenko, 2004
- Dyschirius jordanicus Fedorenko, 1996
- Dyschirius kabakovi (Fedorenko, 1996)
- Dyschirius kadleci Bulirsch, 2009
- Dyschirius kaliki Kult, 1949
- Dyschirius katanganus Burgeon, 1935
- Dyschirius kirghizicus Fedorenko, 1994
- Dyschirius kirschenhoferi (Bulirsch, 2012)
- Dyschirius kryzhanovskii Gryuntal, 1984
- Dyschirius lacustris Andrewes, 1929
- Dyschirius laevifasciatus G. H. Horn, 1878
- Dyschirius laeviusculus Putzeys, 1846
- Dyschirius lambertoni Vuillet, 1910
- Dyschirius larochellei Bousquet, 1988
- Dyschirius latipennis Seidlitz, 1867
- Dyschirius lgockii Fleischer, 1912
- Dyschirius limpopo (Fedorenko, 2000)
- Dyschirius longicollis Motschulsky, 1844
- Dyschirius longipennis Putzeys, 1867
- Dyschirius longulus Leconte, 1850
- Dyschirius luticola Chaudoir, 1850
- Dyschirius luzonicus Kult, 1949
- Dyschirius macroderus Chaudoir, 1850
- Dyschirius macrophthalmus (Fedorenko, 1999)
- Dyschirius mafuga (Bulirsch, 2006)
- Dyschirius magrinii (Bulirsch, 2012)
- Dyschirius mahratta Andrewes, 1929
- Dyschirius malawicus (Bulirsch, 2006)
- Dyschirius marani Kult, 1949
- Dyschirius matisi Lafer, 1989
- Dyschirius melancholicus Putzeys, 1867
- Dyschirius mesopotamicus Jos. Müller, 1922
- Dyschirius microthorax Motschulsky, 1844
- Dyschirius milloti Jeannel, 1949
- Dyschirius minarum Putzeys, 1867
- Dyschirius minutus (Dejean, 1825)
- Dyschirius montanus Leconte, 1879
- Dyschirius moraveci (Bulirsch, 2006)
- Dyschirius morio Putzeys, 1867
- Dyschirius mortchaensis Bruneau de Miré, 1952
- Dyschirius muilwijki (Bulirsch, 2018)
- Dyschirius natalensis (Fedorenko, 1997)
- Dyschirius neoteutonus Fedorenko, 1991
- Dyschirius neresheimeri H. Wagner, 1915
- Dyschirius nianus Fedorenko, 1993
- Dyschirius nigricornis Motschulsky, 1844
- Dyschirius nitens Putzeys, 1878
- Dyschirius nitidus (Dejean, 1825)
- Dyschirius numidicus Putzeys, 1846
- Dyschirius obscurus (Gyllenhaal, 1827)
- Dyschirius ogloblini (Kult, 1950)
- Dyschirius opistholius Alluaud, 1936
- Dyschirius ordinatus H. W. Bates, 1873
- Dyschirius orientalis Putzeys, 1867
- Dyschirius owen Dajoz, 2004
- Dyschirius pacificus Lindroth, 1961
- Dyschirius paleki Kult, 1949
- Dyschirius pallipennis (Say, 1823)
- Dyschirius pampicola Putzeys, 1867
- Dyschirius parallelus Motschulsky, 1844
- Dyschirius parvulus Péringuey, 1896
- Dyschirius patruelis Leconte, 1852
- Dyschirius paucipunctus Andrewes, 1929
- Dyschirius pauxillus Wollaston, 1864
- Dyschirius peringueyi Kult, 1954
- Dyschirius persicus Fedorenko, 1994
- Dyschirius peruanus Fedorenko, 1991
- Dyschirius perversus Fall, 1922
- Dyschirius peyrierasi Basilewsky, 1976
- Dyschirius pfefferi Kult, 1949
- Dyschirius pilosus Leconte, 1857
- Dyschirius planatus Lindroth, 1961
- Dyschirius planiusculus Putzeys, 1867
- Dyschirius politus (Dejean, 1825)
- Dyschirius puchneri (Bulirsch, 2017)
- Dyschirius pumilus (Dejean, 1825)
- Dyschirius punctatus (Dejean, 1825)
- Dyschirius pusillus (Dejean, 1825)
- Dyschirius quadrimaculatus Lindroth, 1961
- Dyschirius recurvus Putzeys, 1867
- Dyschirius reitteri Kult, 1949
- Dyschirius rekawaianus Balkenohl, 2021
- Dyschirius roubali Mařan, 1938
- Dyschirius rufimanus Fleischer, 1898
- Dyschirius rufipes (Dejean, 1825)
- Dyschirius rugifer Putzeys, 1878
- Dyschirius ruthmuellerae Bulirsch, 2009
- Dyschirius sabahensis Bulirsch, 2009
- Dyschirius safraneki (Bulirsch & Fedorenko, 2013)
- Dyschirius salinus Schaum, 1843
- Dyschirius salivagans Leconte, 1875
- Dyschirius saudiarabicus Balkenohl, 1994
- Dyschirius schaumii Putzeys, 1867
- Dyschirius scriptifrons Fleischer, 1898
- Dyschirius sculptus Bousquet, 1988
- Dyschirius sellatus Leconte, 1857
- Dyschirius selvas (Fedorenko, 1999)
- Dyschirius semistriatus (Dejean, 1825)
- Dyschirius senegalensis Bruneau de Miré, 1952
- Dyschirius setosus Leconte, 1857
- Dyschirius sevanensis Iablokoff-Khnzorian, 1962
- Dyschirius sextoni Bousquet, 1987
- Dyschirius sextoni Bousquet, 1987
- Dyschirius shaumii Putzeys, 1866
- Dyschirius sjostedti Gi. Müller, 1935
- Dyschirius smetanai (Bulirsch, 2011)
- Dyschirius smyrnensis (Fedorenko, 1996)
- Dyschirius snizeki (Bulirsch, 2011)
- Dyschirius soda Dajoz, 2004
- Dyschirius sonamargensis Balkenohl, 1994
- Dyschirius speculifer Andrewes, 1929
- Dyschirius sphaericollis (Say, 1823)
- Dyschirius sphaerulifer H. W. Bates, 1873
- Dyschirius stellula Andrewes, 1936
- Dyschirius steno H. W. Bates, 1873
- Dyschirius stenoderus Putzeys, 1873
- Dyschirius strumosus Erichson, 1837
- Dyschirius subarcticus Lindroth, 1961
- Dyschirius sublaevis Putzeys, 1846
- Dyschirius substriatus (Duftschmid, 1812)
- Dyschirius syriacus Putzeys, 1867
- Dyschirius szeli Bulirsch, 2006
- Dyschirius tamil Andrewes, 1929
- Dyschirius tenuescens Andrewes, 1929
- Dyschirius tenuispinus Lindroth, 1961
- Dyschirius terminatus Leconte, 1848
- Dyschirius thailandicus (Fedorenko, 1996)
- Dyschirius thoracicus (P. Rossi, 1790)
- Dyschirius timidus Lindroth, 1961
- Dyschirius tonkinensis (Bulirsch & Fedorenko, 2013)
- Dyschirius tricuspis Andrewes, 1929
- Dyschirius tridentatus Leconte, 1852
- Dyschirius tristis J. F. Stephens, 1827
- Dyschirius truncatus Leconte, 1857
- Dyschirius unipunctatus Fall, 1901
- Dyschirius ussuriensis Fedorenko, 1991
- Dyschirius vadoni Jeannel, 1946
- Dyschirius varidens Fall, 1910
- Dyschirius verticalis Putzeys, 1878
- Dyschirius vietnamicus (Fedorenko, 2000)
- Dyschirius wayah Dajoz, 2005
- Dyschirius weigeli Bulirsch, 2018
- Dyschirius weyrauchi Kult, 1950
- Dyschirius wrasei (Bulirsch, 2017)
- Dyschirius yezoensis H. W. Bates, 1883
- Dyschirius zambesiensis (Fedorenko, 2000)
- Dyschirius zanzibaricus Chaudoir, 1878
- Dyschirius zimini Znojko, 1928
