= List of Nebria species =

These 510 species belong to Nebria, a genus of ground beetles in the family Carabidae.

== Subgenus Alpaeonebria Csiki, 1946 ==
Nebria bissenica E.A.Bielz, 1887 - Romania
Nebria bosnica Ganglbauer, 1889 - Europe
Nebria carpathica E.A.Bielz, 1850 - Romania
Nebria crenatostriata Bassi, 1834 - Switzerland, Italy
Nebria currax Wollaston, 1864 - Canary Islands
Nebria dilatata Dejean, 1831 - Canary Islands
Nebria exul Peyerimhoff, 1910 - Algeria
Nebria fasciatopunctata L.Miller, 1850 - Austria, Slovenia, Croatia
Nebria fuscipes Fuss, 1849 - Europe
Nebria ganglbaueri Apfelbeck, 1905 - Europe
Nebria germarii Heer, 1837 - Europe
Nebria hybrida Rottenberg, 1874 - Bulgaria
Nebria kocheri Verdier, 1953 - Morocco
Nebria merditana Apfelbeck, 1906 - Albania
Nebria quezeli Verdier, 1953 - Morocco
Nebria reichii Dejean, 1826 - Ukraine, Romania
Nebria reitteri Rybinski, 1902 - Ukraine, Romania
Nebria rhilensis J.Frivaldszky, 1879 - Bulgaria
Nebria velebiticola Reitter, 1902 - Croatia

== Subgenus Archastes Jedlicka, 1935 ==
Nebria altitudinis (Ledoux & Roux, 1996) - China
Nebria anonyma (Ledoux & Roux, 1995) - China
Nebria berezovskii (Shilenkov, 1984) - China
Nebria boulbeni (Ledoux & Roux, 1998) - China
Nebria cenobita (Ledoux & Roux, 1999) - China
Nebria corpulenta (Ledoux & Roux, 2009) - China
Nebria deuvei (Ledoux & Roux, 1989) - China
Nebria dubitata (Ledoux & Roux, 2012) - China
Nebria expansicollis (Ledoux, 1989) - China
Nebria explanata (Ledoux & Roux, 1995) - China
Nebria gansuensis (Ledoux & Roux, 1998) - China
Nebria giachinoi (Ledoux & Roux, 2012) - China
Nebria glabra (Ledoux & Roux, 1995) - China
Nebria haeckeli (Farkac, 1995) - China
Nebria hajeki (Ledoux & Roux, 2009) - China
Nebria hwangtienyuni (Shilenkov & Kryzhanovskij, 1983) - China
Nebria incidata (Ledoux & Roux, 1995) - China
Nebria janfarkaci (Ledoux & Roux, 1997) - China
Nebria lamarckiana (Ledoux & Roux, 2009) - China
Nebria micropora (Ledoux & Roux, 1998) - China
Nebria mingyii (Ledoux & Roux, 2012) - China
Nebria nigrescens (Ledoux & Roux, 1995) - China
Nebria orbiculata (Ledoux & Roux, 1998) - China
Nebria politissima (Ledoux & Roux, 2012) - China
Nebria producta (Ledoux & Roux, 2009) - China
Nebria purkynei (Jedlicka, 1946) - China
Nebria rotundata (Ledoux, 1989) - China
Nebria serissima (Ledoux & Roux, 2009) - China
Nebria setifera (Shilenkov, 1984) - China
Nebria similis (Ledoux & Roux, 2012) - China
Nebria simplex (Ledoux & Roux, 2012) - China
Nebria solitaria (Ledoux & Roux, 1999) - China
Nebria sphaerithorax Ledoux & Roux, 1999 - China
Nebria sterbai (Jedlicka, 1935) - China
Nebria subquadrata (Ledoux & Roux, 1998) - China
Nebria thierryi (Ledoux & Roux, 1995) - China
Nebria triangula (Ledoux & Roux, 1995) - China
Nebria tronqueti (Ledoux & Roux, 1995) - China
Nebria yuae (Ledoux & Roux, 1995) - China

== Subgenus Boreonebria Jeannel, 1937 ==
Nebria baicalica Motschulsky, 1844 - Russia
Nebria bargusinica Shilenkov, 1999 - Russia
Nebria bellorum Kavanaugh, 1979 - United States
Nebria biseriata Lutshnik, 1915 - China, North Korea, Russia
Nebria chaslii Fairmaire, 1886 - China
Nebria crassicornis Van Dyke, 1925 - United States, Canada
Nebria daisetsuzana Ueno, 1952 - Japan
Nebria dekraatzi Oberthür, 1883 - China
Nebria dolicapax Ledoux & Roux, 1992 - China
Nebria fallaciosa Ledoux & Roux, 1992 - China
Nebria frigida R.F.Sahlberg, 1844 - United States, Canada, Russia, Alaska
Nebria genei Gené, 1839 - Sardinia, Italy
Nebria gouleti Kavanaugh, 1979 - United States, Canada
Nebria heegeri Dejean, 1826 - Ukraine, Romania
Nebria hudsonica LeConte, 1863 - United States, Canada
Nebria kaszabi Shilenkov, 1982 - Kazakhstan, Russia, Mongolia
Nebria kerzhneri Shilenkov, 1982 - Mongolia
Nebria klapperichi Bänninger, 1956 - Afghanistan
Nebria lacustris Casey, 1913 - United States, Canada
Nebria latior Ledoux & Roux, 1992 - Kazakhstan
Nebria liae Ledoux & Roux, 2007 - China
Nebria marginata Ledoux & Roux, 1995 - Kazakhstan, China
Nebria mathildae Ledoux & Roux, 2001 - China
Nebria medvedevi Shilenkov, 1982 - Russia, Mongolia
Nebria mingyii Ledoux & Roux, 2014 - China
Nebria murzini Ledoux & Roux, 2000 - China
Nebria nivalis (Paykull, 1790) - North America, Palearctic]]
Nebria pawlowskii Shilenkov, 1983 - North Korea
Nebria pazi Seidlitz, 1867 - Spain
Nebria rubrofemorata Shilenkov, 1975 - Russia
Nebria rufescens (Ström, 1768) - Holarctic]]
Nebria sajanica Bänninger, 1932 - Russia
Nebria saurica Shilenkov, 1976 - Kazakhstan
Nebria schrenkii Gebler, 1843 - Kazakhstan, China
Nebria semenoviana Shilenkov, 1976 - China
Nebria setulata Ledoux & Roux, 1995 - China
Nebria simulator Bänninger, 1933 - North Korea
Nebria sochondensis Shilenkov, 1999 - Russia, Mongolia
Nebria stanislavi Dudko & Matalin, 2002 - Russia
Nebria subaerea Breit, 1914 - Kazakhstan, Kyrgyzstan, China
Nebria subdilatata Motschulsky, 1844 - Asia
Nebria suvorovi Shilenkov, 1976 - Kazakhstan, Kyrgyzstan
Nebria tekesensis Ledoux & Roux, 2005 - China
Nebria tsambagarov C.Huber & Schnitter, 2020 - Mongolia
Nebria tyschkanica Kryzhanovskij & Shilenkov, 1976 - Kazakhstan
Nebria uralensis Glasunov, 1901 - Russia
Nebria wutaishanensis Shilenkov & Dostal, 1983 - China

== Subgenus Catonebria Shilenkov, 1975 ==
Nebria aenea Gebler, 1825 - Kazakhstan, China, Russia, Mongolia
Nebria baicalopacifica Dudko & Shilenkov, 2006 - Russia
Nebria banksi Crotch, 1871 - North Korea, Russia
Nebria baumanni Kavanaugh, 2015 - United States
Nebria calva Kavanaugh, 1984 - United States
Nebria catenata Casey, 1913 - United States
Nebria catenulata Fischer von Waldheim, 1820 - China, North Korea, Russia
Nebria coloradensis Van Dyke, 1943 - United States
Nebria fulgida Gebler, 1847 - Russia
Nebria gebleri Dejean, 1831 - North America
Nebria giulianii Kavanaugh, 1981 - United States
Nebria holzunensis Dudko & Shilenkov, 2006 - Kazakhstan, Mongolia
Nebria ingens G.Horn, 1870 - United States
Nebria labontei Kavanaugh, 1984 - United States
Nebria lamarckensis Kavanaugh, 1979 - United States
Nebria meanyi Van Dyke, 1925 - North America
Nebria metallica Fischer von Waldheim, 1820 - North America
Nebria pektusanica Horvatovich, 1973 - North Korea
Nebria piperi Van Dyke, 1925 - North America
Nebria piute Erwin & Ball, 1972 - United States
Nebria praedicta Kavanaugh & Schoville, 2009 - United States
Nebria purpurata LeConte, 1878 - United States, Canada
Nebria scaphelytra Kavanaugh & Shilenkov, 1996 - North Korea
Nebria schwarzi Van Dyke, 1925 - United States, Canada
Nebria sierrablancae Kavanaugh, 1984 - United States
Nebria splendida Fischer von Waldheim, 1844 - Kazakhstan
Nebria steensensis Kavanaugh, 1984 - United States
Nebria suensoni Shilenkov & Dostal, 1983 - China
Nebria sylvatica Kavanaugh, 1979 - United States, Canada
Nebria trifaria LeConte, 1878 - United States
Nebria vandykei Bänninger, 1928 - United States

== Subgenus Eonebria Semenov & Znojko, 1928 ==
Nebria agilis Ledoux & Roux, 1996 - China
Nebria amabilis Ledoux; Roux & Sawada, 1991 - China
Nebria archastoides Ledoux & Roux, 1997 - China
Nebria armata Ledoux & Roux, 1999 - China
Nebria augustini Ledoux & Roux, 2000 - China
Nebria bodpaica Ledoux & Roux, 1998 - China
Nebria bowashanensis Janata & Mikyska, 2009 - China
Nebria cathaica Sciaky & Pavesi, 1994 - China
Nebria cavazzutii Ledoux & Roux, 2005 - China
Nebria celata Ledoux & Roux, 1999 - China
Nebria civilis Ledoux & Roux, 1998 - China
Nebria compacta Ledoux & Roux, 1999 - China
Nebria conjuncta Ledoux & Roux, 1996 - China
Nebria coruscans Ledoux & Roux, 2005 - China
Nebria cursitans Ledoux & Roux, 1998 - China
Nebria delectabilis Ledoux & Roux, 1995 - China
Nebria delineata Ledoux & Roux, 1998 - China
Nebria djakonovi Semenov & Znojko, 1928 - Russia
Nebria fairmairei Ledoux & Roux, 1992 - China
Nebria flexuosa Ledoux & Roux, 1995 - China
Nebria funerea Ledoux & Roux, 1992 - China
Nebria gemina Ledoux; Roux & Wrase, 1996 - China
Nebria globulosa Ledoux & Roux, 1996 - China
Nebria gratiosa Ledoux & Roux, 1998 - China
Nebria guttulata Ledoux & Roux, 2000 - China
Nebria heishuiensis Ledoux & Roux, 2008 - China
Nebria helianta Ledoux & Roux, 2001 - China
Nebria hollandei Ledoux & Roux, 1993 - China
Nebria inexpectata Ledoux & Roux, 2006 - China
Nebria irrorata Ledoux & Roux, 1995 - China
Nebria jugosa Ledoux & Roux, 1998 - China
Nebria komarovi Semenov & Znojko, 1928 - North Korea, Russia
Nebria kryzhanovskii Shilenkov, 1982 - China
Nebria kubaniana Ledoux & Roux, 1998 - China
Nebria kurentzovi Lafer, 1989 - Russia
Nebria lenis Ledoux & Roux, 1995 - China
Nebria lingulata Janata & Mikyska, 2009 - China
Nebria longilingua Ledoux & Roux, 1991 - China
Nebria lucidissima Sciaky & Pavesi, 1994 - China
Nebria lucifer Ledoux & Roux, 1998 - China
Nebria meissonnieri Ledoux & Roux, 2008 - China
Nebria memorabilis Ledoux & Roux, 1992 - China
Nebria micans Ledoux & Roux, 1998 - China
Nebria microphthalma Ledoux & Roux, 1998 - China
Nebria mirkae Janata & Mikyska, 2009 - China
Nebria mucronata Ledoux & Roux, 1999 - China
Nebria neglecta Ledoux & Roux, 2008 - China
Nebria negrei Ledoux & Roux, 1992 - China
Nebria nigricans Ledoux & Roux, 2000 - China
Nebria obscura Ledoux & Roux, 2012 - China
Nebria parvulissima Ledoux & Roux, 1998 - China
Nebria persimilis Ledoux & Roux, 2012 - China
Nebria pilipila Ledoux & Roux, 2006 - China
Nebria plicata Ledoux & Roux, 1992 - China
Nebria polita Ledoux, 1989 - China
Nebria puella Ledoux & Roux, 1998 - China
Nebria sciakyi Ledoux & Roux, 1996 - China
Nebria setosa Ledoux & Roux, 1995 - China
Nebria shatanica Ledoux & Roux, 2005 - China
Nebria sifanica Semenov & Znojko, 1928 - China
Nebria simplex Ledoux & Roux, 1996 - China
Nebria simulatoria Ledoux & Roux, 1993 - China
Nebria spinosa Ledoux & Roux, 1995 - China
Nebria stricta Ledoux & Roux, 1991 - China
Nebria suavis Ledoux & Roux, 1996 - China
Nebria ultima Ledoux & Roux, 1998 - China
Nebria valida Ledoux & Roux, 1996 - China
Nebria vicina Ledoux & Roux, 1999 - China
Nebria vladiae Ledoux & Roux, 2005 - China
Nebria wraseiana Ledoux & Roux, 1996 - China
Nebria xiangchengica Janata & Mikyska, 2009 - China

== Subgenus Epinebriola K.Daniel in K. & J.Daniel, 1904 ==
Nebria assidua C.Huber & J.Schmidt, 2009 - Nepal
Nebria barbata Andrewes, 1929 - Pakistan, India
Nebria businskyorum Ledoux & Roux, 1997 - China
Nebria capillosa Ledoux & Roux, 1992 - Nepal, India
Nebria chitralensis Shilenkov & Heinz, 1988 - Pakistan
Nebria christinae C.Huber & J.Schmidt, 2007 - Nepal
Nebria desgodinsi Oberthür, 1883 - Nepal, India
Nebria elegans Andrewes, 1925 - India
Nebria ganeshi Ledoux, 1984 - India
Nebria hiekeiana C.Huber & Baur, 2016 - Pakistan
Nebria himalayica Bates, 1889 - Afghanistan, China, Pakistan, India
Nebria impunctata C.Huber & J.Schmidt, 2017 - Nepal
Nebria incarinata C.Huber & J.Schmidt, 2017 - India
Nebria incognita C.Huber & Baur, 2016 - Afghanistan, Pakistan, Nepal, India
Nebria kabakovi Shilenkov, 1982 - Afghanistan
Nebria kagmara C.Huber & J.Schmidt, 2017 - Nepal
Nebria laevistriata Ledoux & Roux, 1998 - China
Nebria livida (Linnaeus, 1758) - Palearctic
Nebria macrogona Bates, 1873 - Japan
Nebria martensi C.Huber & J.Schmidt, 2012 - Nepal
Nebria masrina Andrewes, 1924 - Pakistan, India
Nebria megalops C.Huber & Geiser, 2012 - China
Nebria meurguesae Ledoux, 1985 - Afghanistan
Nebria molendai C.Huber & J.Schmidt, 2007 - Nepal
Nebria montisanimae C.Huber & J.Schmidt, 2017 - Nepal
Nebria nouristanensis Ledoux, 1985 - Afghanistan, Pakistan
Nebria numburica C.Huber & J.Schmidt, 2017 - Nepal
Nebria orestias Andrewes, 1932 - India
Nebria oxyptera K.Daniel in K. & J.Daniel, 1904 - China
Nebria paropamisos C.Huber; J.Schmidt & Baur, 2013 - Afghanistan, Pakistan
Nebria pertinax C.Huber & J.Schmidt, 2009 - Nepal
Nebria pindarica Andrewes, 1925 - India
Nebria poplii Ledoux, 1984 - India
Nebria praelonga Ledoux, 1985 - Afghanistan
Nebria pseudorestias C.Huber & J.Schmidt, 2017 - Nepal
Nebria rasa Andrewes, 1936 - India
Nebria restricta Ledoux & Roux, 2005 - India
Nebria rotundicollis Heinz & Ledoux, 1990 - Pakistan
Nebria rubostipes C.Huber & J.Schmidt, 2017 - Nepal
Nebria rupina C.Huber & J.Schmidt, 2017 - Nepal
Nebria schawalleri Shilenkov, 1998 - Nepal
Nebria tangjelaensis Shilenkov, 1998 - Nepal
Nebria tenuisulcata C.Huber & J.Schmidt, 2017 - Nepal
Nebria triseriata C.Huber & J.Schmidt, 2017 - Nepal
Nebria tuberculata C.Huber & J.Schmidt, 2017 - Nepal
Nebria zayula Andrewes, 1936 - China

== Subgenus Epispadias Ledoux & Roux, 1999 ==
Nebria janschneideri Ledoux & Roux, 1999 - China

== Subgenus Erwinebria Kavanaugh, 2021 ==
Nebria acuta Lindroth, 1961 - North America
Nebria arkansana Casey, 1913 - United States, Canada
Nebria charlottae Lindroth, 1961 - Canada
Nebria danmanni Kavanaugh, 1981 - United States
Nebria gregaria Fischer von Waldheim, 1820 - United States, Alaska
Nebria haida Kavanaugh, 1984 - Canada
Nebria jeffreyi Kavanaugh, 1984 - United States
Nebria lituyae Kavanaugh, 1979 - North America
Nebria louiseae Kavanaugh, 1984 - Canada
Nebria lyelli Van Dyke, 1925 - United States
Nebria sahlbergii Fischer von Waldheim, 1828 - North America
Nebria wallowae Kavanaugh, 1984 - United States
Nebria zioni Van Dyke, 1943 - United States

== Subgenus Eunebria Jeannel, 1937 ==
Nebria aborana Andrewes, 1925 - China, India
Nebria ambigua Glasunov, 1902 - Tadzhikistan
Nebria boiteli Alluaud, 1932 - Morocco
Nebria cameroni Andrewes, 1925 - Pakistan, Nepal, India
Nebria cinctella Andrewes, 1925 - India
Nebria composita Ledoux & Roux, 1993 - China
Nebria dacatrai Ledoux & Roux, 1996 - China
Nebria davatchii Morvan, 1974 - Iran
Nebria ferganensis Shilenkov, 1982 - Kyrgyzstan
Nebria fongondi Ledoux, 1981 - Pakistan
Nebria grombczewskii Semenov, 1891 - China
Nebria grumi Glasunov, 1902 - Asia
Nebria haberhaueri Heyden, 1889 - Asia
Nebria jarrigei Ledoux & Roux, 1991 - Turkey, Georgia, Russia
Nebria jockischii Sturm, 1815 - Europe
Nebria kirgisica Shilenkov, 1982 - Kyrgyzstan
Nebria kyanjinica C.Huber & J.Schmidt, 2018 - Nepal
Nebria lewisi Bates, 1874 - Japan
Nebria limbigera Solsky, 1874 - Asia
Nebria mniszechii Chaudoir, 1854 - Georgia, Russia
Nebria morvani Ledoux & Roux, 1999 - Nepal
Nebria nana Ledoux & Roux, 1996 - China
Nebria nanshanica Shilenkov, 1982 - China
Nebria nataliae Kabak & Putchkov, 1996 - Kyrgyzstan
Nebria nigerrima Chaudoir, 1846 - Palearctic
Nebria oberthuri Ledoux & Roux, 1991 - China
Nebria panshiri Ledoux & Roux, 1997 - Afghanistan
Nebria pashupatii C.Huber & J.Schmidt, 2018 - Nepal
Nebria perlonga Heyden, 1885 - Tadzhikistan
Nebria picicornis (Fabricius, 1792) - Paelarctic
Nebria picta Semenov, 1891 - Tadzhikistan, Afghanistan, Pakistan
Nebria plagiata Bänninger, 1923 - China
Nebria przewalskii Semenov, 1889 - China
Nebria psammodes (P.Rossi, 1792) - Europe
Nebria psammophila Solsky, 1874 - Asia
Nebria pulcherrima Bates, 1873 - China, Japan
Nebria pulchrior Maindron, 1906 - China
Nebria sublivida Semenov, 1889 - China
Nebria talassica Shilenkov, 1982 - Kazakhstan, Uzbekistan, Kyrgyzstan
Nebria tetungi Shilenkov, 1982 - China
Nebria torosa Ledoux; Roux & Sciaky, 1994 - China
Nebria tshatkalica Kabak & Shilenkov in Kabak, 2001 - Kyrgyzstan
Nebria uenoiana Habu, 1972 - Taiwan
Nebria xanthacra Chaudoir, 1850 - Asia
Nebria yunnana Bänninger, 1928 - China

== Subgenus Eurynebria Ganglbauer, 1891 ==
Nebria complanata (Linnaeus, 1767) - Europe, Near East]]

== Subgenus Falcinebria Ledoux & Roux, 2005 ==
Nebria bousqueti Ledoux, 1993 - Taiwan
Nebria chugokuensis Sasakawa, 2020 - Japan
Nebria dichotoma Sasakawa, 2020 - Japan
Nebria formosana Habu, 1972 - Taiwan
Nebria furcata Sasakawa, 2020 - Japan
Nebria iidesana Sasakawa, 2020 - Japan
Nebria kuragadakensis Sasakawa, 2020 - Japan
Nebria nakanei Ueno, 1953 - Japan
Nebria niohozana Bates, 1883 - Japan
Nebria pisciformis Sasakawa, 2020 - Japan
Nebria reflexa Bates, 1883 - Japan
Nebria rougemonti Ledoux & Roux, 1988 - China
Nebria sagittata Sasakawa, 2020 - Japan
Nebria tiani Ledoux & Roux, 2003 - China
Nebria uenoi Nakane, 1963 - Japan

== Subgenus Insulanebria Kavanaugh, 2021 ==
Nebria carbonaria Eschscholtz, 1829 - Russia
Nebria snowi Bates, 1883 - Russia

== Subgenus Nakanebria Ledoux & Roux, 2005 ==
Nebria gibbulosa Motschulsky, 1860 - Russia
Nebria kumgangi Shilenkov, 1983 - North Korea
Nebria kurosawai Nakane, 1960 - Japan
Nebria shibanaii Ueno, 1955 - Japan, Russia

== Subgenus Neaptenonebria Kavanaugh, 2021 ==
Nebria carri Kavanaugh, 1979 - United States
Nebria kincaidi Schwarz, 1900 - North America
Nebria ovipennis LeConte, 1878 - United States
Nebria spatulata Van Dyke, 1925 - United States

== Subgenus Nebria Latreille, 1802 ==
Nebria adjarica Shilenkov, 1983 - Turkey, Georgia
Nebria aetolica Apfelbeck, 1901 - Greece
Nebria alpicola (Motschulsky, 1866) - Turkey
Nebria andalusia Rambur, 1837 - Europe, North Africa
Nebria andarensis Bolivar y Pieltain, 1923 - Spain
Nebria araschinica Reitter, 1892 - Turkey, Armenia
Nebria arcensis Ledoux & Roux, 1990 - Turkey
Nebria asturiensis Bruneau de Miré, 1964 - Spain
Nebria atlantica Oberthür, 1883 - Morocco
Nebria attemsi Apfelbeck, 1908 - Europe
Nebria azarbayanei Muilwijk, 2015 - Iran
Nebria belloti Franz, 1954 - Spain
Nebria bonellii (M.Adams, 1817) - Turkey, Georgia, Russia
Nebria brevicollis (Fabricius, 1792) - Holarctic
Nebria caucasica Ménétriés, 1832 - Russia
Nebria chelmosensis Maran, 1944 - Greece
Nebria commixta Chaudoir, 1850 - Georgia, Armenia, Russia
Nebria dahlii (Duftschmid, 1812) - Europe
Nebria dejeanii Dejean, 1826 - Austria
Nebria deuveiana Ledoux & Roux, 1990 - Turkey
Nebria elbursiaca Bodemeyer, 1927 - Iran
Nebria elliptipennis Bates, 1874 - Turkey
Nebria fageticola C.Huber & Marggi, 2009 - Greece
Nebria faldermanni Ménétriés, 1832 - Azerbaijan
Nebria femoralis Chaudoir, 1843 - Romania
Nebria finissima Ledoux & Roux, 1990 - Turkey
Nebria fischeri Faldermann, 1836 - Turkey, Georgia
Nebria georgesi Roux & Wrase, 2007 - Turkey
Nebria glacicola Ledoux & Roux, 2001 - Turkey
Nebria gotschii Chaudoir, 1846 - Turkey, Armenia
Nebria hellwigii (Panzer, 1802) - Germany, Austria, Italy
Nebria hemprichi Klug, 1832 - Middle East
Nebria heydenii Dejean, 1831 - Greece
Nebria irregularis Jedlicka, 1965 - Turkey
Nebria korgei Jedlicka, 1965 - Turkey
Nebria kratteri Dejean, 1831 - Europe
Nebria lafresnayei Audinet-Serville, 1821 - France, Spain
Nebria leonensis Assmann; Wrase & Zaballos, 2000 - Spain
Nebria macedonica Maran, 1938 - North Macedonia, Albania, Greece
Nebria mandibularis Bates, 1872 - Turkey, Iran
Nebria mirabilis Ledoux & Roux, 1990 - Turkey
Nebria motschulskyi Chaudoir, 1846 - Azerbaijan, Russia
Nebria olivieri Dejean, 1826 - France, Spain
Nebria olympica Maran, 1938 - Greece
Nebria patruelis Chaudoir, 1846 - Georgia
Nebria peristerica Apfelbeck, 1901 - Greece
Nebria pontica Ledoux & Roux, 1990 - Turkey
Nebria posthuma K. & J.Daniel, 1891 - Italy
Nebria punctatostriata L.Schaufuss, 1876 - Portugal
Nebria retrospinosa Heyden, 1885 - Georgia, Russia
Nebria rousseleti Ledoux & Roux, 1988 - France
Nebria rubripes Audinet-Serville, 1821 - France
Nebria salina Fairmaire & Laboulbène, 1854 - Europe
Nebria schlegelmilchi (M.Adams, 1817) - Iran, Georgia, Armenia
Nebria sevanensis Shilenkov, 1983 - Armenia
Nebria sitiens Antoine, 1937 - Morocco
Nebria sobrina L.Schaufuss, 1862 - Spain
Nebria speiseri Ganglbauer, 1891 - Europe
Nebria storkani Maran, 1939 - Albania, Greece
Nebria tatrica L.Miller, 1859 - Slovakia, Poland
Nebria taygetana Rottenberg, 1874 - Greece
Nebria tenella Motschulsky, 1850 - Georgia, Russia
Nebria thonitida Ledoux & Roux, 1990 - Turkey
Nebria tibialis (Bonelli, 1810) - Italy
Nebria transsylvanica Germar, 1823 - Ukraine, Romania, Moldova
Nebria tristicula Reitter, 1888 - Georgia, Russia
Nebria turcica Chaudoir, 1843 - Turkey
Nebria urbionensis Arribas, 1991 - Spain
Nebria verticalis Fischer von Waldheim, 1828 - Georgia, Azerbaijan
Nebria viridipennis Reitter, 1885 - Georgia, Russia
Nebria vseteckai Maran, 1938 - Greece
Nebria vuillefroyi Chaudoir, 1866 - Spain
Nebria walterheinzi Ledoux & Roux, 1990 - Turkey

== Subgenus Nebriola K.Daniel, 1903 ==
Nebria casalei Giachino, 2013 - Italy
Nebria cordicollis Chaudoir, 1837 - Switzerland, Italy
Nebria fontinalis K. & J.Daniel, 1890 - Switzerland, Italy
Nebria gosteliae C.Huber, 2010 - Italy
Nebria heeri K.Daniel, 1903 - Germany, Switzerland
Nebria lariollei Germiny, 1865 - France
Nebria laticollis Dejean, 1826 - France, Switzerland, Italy
Nebria morula K. & J.Daniel, 1891 - France, Italy
Nebria pictiventris Fauvel, 1888 - France, Italy

== Subgenus Nivalonebria Kavanaugh, 2021 ==
Nebria paradisi Darlington, 1931 - United States, Canada
Nebria turmaduodecima Kavanaugh, 1981 - United States

== Subgenus Oreonebria K.Daniel, 1903 ==
Nebria angustata Dejean, 1831 - Switzerland, Italy
Nebria angusticollis (Bonelli, 1810) - France, Switzerland, Italy
Nebria atrata Dejean, 1826 - Austria
Nebria austriaca Ganglbauer, 1889 - Germany, Austria, Italy
Nebria bluemlisalpicola (Szallies & C.Huber, 2014) - Switzerland
Nebria boschi (Winkler in Horion, 1949) - Germany
Nebria bremii Germar, 1831 - Germany, Switzerland, Austria
Nebria castanea (Bonelli, 1810) - Europe
Nebria diaphana K. & J.Daniel, 1890 - Europe
Nebria gagates (Bonelli, 1810) - France, Italy
Nebria ligurica K.Daniel, 1903 - France, Italy
Nebria lombarda K. & J.Daniel, 1890 - Italy
Nebria macrodera K.Daniel, 1903 - France, Italy
Nebria mondini Sciaky; Magrini & Mondin, 2020 - Italy
Nebria picea Dejean, 1826 - Europe
Nebria raetzeri Bänninger, 1932 - France, Switzerland
Nebria schusteri Ganglbauer, 1889 - Austria
Nebria soror K.Daniel, 1903 - Italy

== Subgenus Orientonebria Shilenkov, 1975 ==
Nebria coreica Solsky, 1875 - North Korea, Japan, Russia

== Subgenus Palaptenonebria Kavanaugh, 2021 ==
Nebria arinae Dudko & Shilenkov, 2001 - Kazakhstan, Russia
Nebria baenningeri Dudko & Shilenkov, 2001 - Kazakhstan, Russia
Nebria lyubechanskii Dudko, 2008 - Russia
Nebria mellyi Gebler, 1847 - Russia
Nebria roddi Dudko & Shilenkov, 2001 - Kazakhstan, Russia
Nebria sajana Dudko & Shilenkov, 2001 - Russia

== Subgenus Parepinebriola Kavanaugh, 2021 ==
Nebria delicata C.Huber & J.Schmidt, 2017 - China
Nebria retingensis C.Huber & J.Schmidt, 2017 - China

== Subgenus Psilonebria Andrewes, 1923 ==
Nebria hiekei Shilenkov, 1982 - China
Nebria ledouxi Roux, 2021 - China
Nebria lhachenica C.Huber & J.Schmidt, 2018 - China
Nebria loebliana C.Huber & J.Schmidt, 2018 - China
Nebria mentoincisa C.Huber & J.Schmidt, 2013 - China
Nebria orientalis Bänninger, 1949 - China
Nebria pharina Andrewes, 1929 - China
Nebria roborowskii Semenov, 1889 - China
Nebria superna Andrewes, 1923 - China, Nepal
Nebria unguinosa Ledoux; Roux & Sciaky, 1994 - China

== Subgenus Reductonebria Shilenkov, 1975 ==
Nebria angustula Motschulsky, 1866 - Russia
Nebria appalachia Darlington, 1932 - United States
Nebria darlingtoni Kavanaugh, 1979 - United States
Nebria desolata Kavanaugh, 1971 - United States
Nebria diversa LeConte, 1863 - United States, Canada
Nebria eschscholtzii Ménétriés, 1843 - North America
Nebria georgei Kavanaugh, 2006 - United States
Nebria mannerheimii Fischer von Waldheim, 1828 - North America
Nebria navajo Kavanaugh, 1979 - United States
Nebria nicolasi Ledoux & Roux, 2006 - China
Nebria obliqua LeConte, 1867 - North America
Nebria ochotica R.F.Sahlberg, 1844 - Asia
Nebria pallipes Say, 1823 - United States, Canada
Nebria suturalis LeConte, 1850 - United States, Canada

== Subgenus Sadonebria Ledoux & Roux, 2005 ==
Nebria asahina Sasakawa, 2009 - Japan
Nebria chichibuensis Sasakawa, 2010 - Japan
Nebria chinensis Bates, 1872 - Asia
Nebria jakuchisana Sasakawa, 2009 - Japan
Nebria kiso Sasakawa, 2009 - Japan
Nebria mikawa Sasakawa, 2009 - Japan
Nebria nasuensis Sasakawa, 2009 - Japan
Nebria niitakana Kano, 1930 - Taiwan
Nebria quinquelobata Sasakawa, 2016 - Japan
Nebria sadona Bates, 1883 - Japan
Nebria saeviens Bates, 1883 - Japan
Nebria shikokuensis Sasakawa, 2011 - Japan
Nebria tenuicaulis Sasakawa & Kubota, 2006 - Japan
Nebria trifida Sasakawa, 2008 - Japan
Nebria yatsugatakensis Sasakawa, 2016 - Japan

== Subgenus Spelaeonebria Peyerimhoff, 1911 ==
Nebria nudicollis Peyerimhoff, 1911 - Algeria

== Subgenus Tyrrhenia Ledoux & Roux, 2005 ==
Nebria apuana Busi & Rivalta, 1980 - Italy
Nebria coiffaiti Ledoux, 1983 - Turkey
Nebria eugeniae K.Daniel, 1903 - Bulgaria
Nebria fulviventris Bassi, 1834 - Italy
Nebria holtzi K.Daniel, 1903 - Greece
Nebria lareynii Fairmaire, 1858 - France, Corse
Nebria oramarensis Shilenkov & Heinz, 1984 - Turkey
Nebria orsinii A. & G.B.Villa, 1839 - Italy
Nebria pennisii Magrini, 1987 - Italy
Nebria peyerimhoffi Alluaud, 1923 - Morocco
Nebria reymondi Antoine, 1951 - Morocco
Nebria rubicunda (Quensel, 1806) - Spain, North Africa
Nebria testacea Olivier, 1811 - Greece, Turkey
Nebria uluderensis Shilenkov & Heinz, 1984 - Turkey
Nebria vanvolxemi Putzeys, 1874 - Portugal

== Incertae sedis fossil taxa ==
†Nebria abstracta Scudder, 1900
†Nebria dobbertinensis Geinitz, 1894
†Nebria fossilis Piton & Theobald, 1935
†Nebria nitens Geinitz, 1894
†Nebria occlusa Scudder, 1900
†Nebria paleomelas Scudder, 1879
†Nebria pluto Heer, 1862
†Nebria scudderi Geinitz, 1894
†Nebria trisiphone Oustalet, 1874
