= Nebria atrata =

Scientific classification
- Kingdom: Animalia
- Phylum: Arthropoda
- Class: Insecta
- Order: Coleoptera
- Suborder: Adephaga
- Family: Carabidae
- Genus: Nebria
- Subgenus: Oreonebria
- Species: N. atrata

Binomial name
- Nebria atrata (Dejean, 1826)

Synonyms
- Nebria atrata Dejean, 1826

Species of beetle

Nebria atrata is a species of ground beetle that is endemic to Austria. The species is placed in subgenus Oreonebria and Nebria is placed in subfamily Nebriinae.
