= Nebria reitteri =

Scientific classification
- Domain: Eukaryota
- Kingdom: Animalia
- Phylum: Arthropoda
- Class: Insecta
- Order: Coleoptera
- Suborder: Adephaga
- Family: Carabidae
- Genus: Nebria
- Subgenus: Nebria (Alpaeonebria)
- Species: N. reitteri

Binomial name
- Nebria reitteri Rybinski, 1902

Synonyms
- Nebria radnaensis Horvatovich, 1972

Species of beetle

Nebria reitteri is a species of ground beetle in the Nebriinae subfamily. It is found in Romania and Ukraine, where it inhabits the banks of streams and forest areas at high altitudes.

Adults have a size of 11-13 mm.
