= Nebria kocheri =

Scientific classification
- Domain: Eukaryota
- Kingdom: Animalia
- Phylum: Arthropoda
- Class: Insecta
- Order: Coleoptera
- Suborder: Adephaga
- Family: Carabidae
- Genus: Nebria
- Subgenus: Nebria (Alpaeonebria)
- Species: N. kocheri

Binomial name
- Nebria kocheri Verdier, 1953

Synonyms
- Nebria (Alpaeonebria) kocheri Verdier, 1953

Species of beetle

Nebria kocheri is a species of ground beetle in the Nebriinae subfamily that is endemic to Morocco.
