= Nebria raetzeri =

Scientific classification
- Kingdom: Animalia
- Phylum: Arthropoda
- Class: Insecta
- Order: Coleoptera
- Suborder: Adephaga
- Family: Carabidae
- Genus: Nebria
- Subgenus: Oreonebria
- Species: N. raetzeri

Binomial name
- Nebria raetzeri (Banninger, 1932)

Synonyms
- Nebria henroti Jeannel, 1938

Species of beetle

Nebria raetzeri is a species of ground beetle in the Nebriinae subfamily that can be found in France and Switzerland. The species is place in subgenus Oreonebria.
