= Nebria capillosa =

Scientific classification
- Domain: Eukaryota
- Kingdom: Animalia
- Phylum: Arthropoda
- Class: Insecta
- Order: Coleoptera
- Suborder: Adephaga
- Family: Carabidae
- Genus: Nebria
- Species: N. capillosa

Binomial name
- Nebria capillosa Ledoux & Roux, 1992

Species of beetle

Nebria capillosa is a species of ground beetle from Nebriinae subfamily that is endemic to Nepal.
