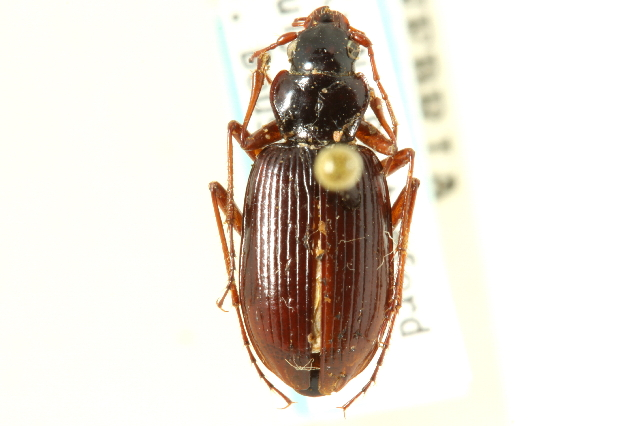

Scientific classification
- Domain: Eukaryota
- Kingdom: Animalia
- Phylum: Arthropoda
- Class: Insecta
- Order: Coleoptera
- Suborder: Adephaga
- Family: Carabidae
- Genus: Nebria
- Species: N. obliqua

Binomial name
- Nebria obliqua LeConte, 1867

Synonyms
- Nebria obtusa LeConte, 1878; Nebria incerta Casey, 1913; Nebria testaceipes Casey, 1913; Nebria texana Casey, 1913

= Nebria obliqua =

Species of beetle

Nebria obliqua is a species of ground beetle in the family Carabidae. It is found in North America.

== Subspecies ==
These two subspecies belong to the species Nebria obliqua:

- Nebria obliqua chuskae Kavanaugh, 1979 (Arizona) - Chuska Mountains gazelle beetle
- Nebria obliqua obliqua (United States, Canada) - Oblique Mountains gazelle beetle
