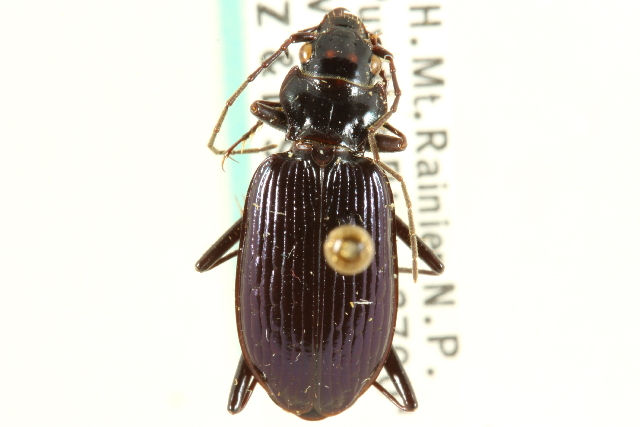

Scientific classification
- Domain: Eukaryota
- Kingdom: Animalia
- Phylum: Arthropoda
- Class: Insecta
- Order: Coleoptera
- Suborder: Adephaga
- Family: Carabidae
- Genus: Nebria
- Species: N. piperi

Binomial name
- Nebria piperi Van Dyke, 1925

= Nebria piperi =

Species of beetle

Nebria piperi, Piper's gazelle beetle, is a species of beetle from family Carabidae found in Canada and the US states of Washington (near the Tahoma River), Alaska and Oregon, as well as in British Columbia. It is found near water on barren, stony banks of rivers.

Adults are nocturnal and carnivorous.

== Description and further distribution ==
It is 19 millimetres (0.75 in) in length and is shiny metallic purple coloured.
