= Nebria wallowae =

Scientific classification
- Domain: Eukaryota
- Kingdom: Animalia
- Phylum: Arthropoda
- Class: Insecta
- Order: Coleoptera
- Suborder: Adephaga
- Family: Carabidae
- Genus: Nebria
- Subgenus: Nebria (Reductonebria)
- Species: N. wallowae

Binomial name
- Nebria wallowae Kavanaugh, 1984

Species of beetle

Nebria wallowae, the Wallowa Mountains gazelle beetle, is a species of ground beetle in the Nebriinae subfamily that is endemic to the US state of Oregon, where it may be found on lake shores and along the margins of streams and in meadows in upland areas and the mountains.

Adults are nocturnal and carnivorous.
