= Nebria suensoni =

Scientific classification
- Kingdom: Animalia
- Phylum: Arthropoda
- Class: Insecta
- Order: Coleoptera
- Suborder: Adephaga
- Family: Carabidae
- Genus: Nebria
- Species: N. suensoni

Binomial name
- Nebria suensoni Shilenkov & Dostal, 1983

Species of beetle

Nebria suensoni is a species of ground beetle in the Nebriinae subfamily that is endemic to China.
