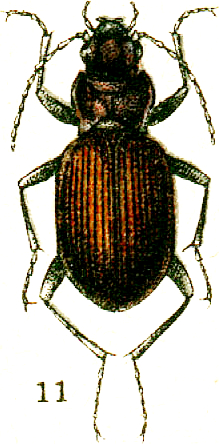

Scientific classification
- Domain: Eukaryota
- Kingdom: Animalia
- Phylum: Arthropoda
- Class: Insecta
- Order: Coleoptera
- Suborder: Adephaga
- Family: Carabidae
- Genus: Nebria
- Species: N. bonellii

Binomial name
- Nebria bonellii M.F. Adams, 1817

= Nebria bonellii =

Species of beetle

Nebria bonellii is a metal coloured species of ground beetle in the Nebriinae subfamily that can be found in Georgia, Russia and Turkey.
