= Nebria uenoiana =

Scientific classification
- Kingdom: Animalia
- Phylum: Arthropoda
- Class: Insecta
- Order: Coleoptera
- Suborder: Adephaga
- Family: Carabidae
- Genus: Nebria
- Species: N. uenoiana

Binomial name
- Nebria uenoiana Habu, 1972

Species of beetle

Nebria uenoiana is a species of ground beetle in the Nebriinae subfamily that can be found in China and Taiwan.
