= Nebria arinae =

Scientific classification
- Domain: Eukaryota
- Kingdom: Animalia
- Phylum: Arthropoda
- Class: Insecta
- Order: Coleoptera
- Suborder: Adephaga
- Family: Carabidae
- Genus: Nebria
- Species: N. arinae

Binomial name
- Nebria arinae Dudko & Shilenkov, 2001

Species of beetle

Nebria arinae is a species of ground beetle in the Nebriinae family that is endemic to the Altai region of Russia.
