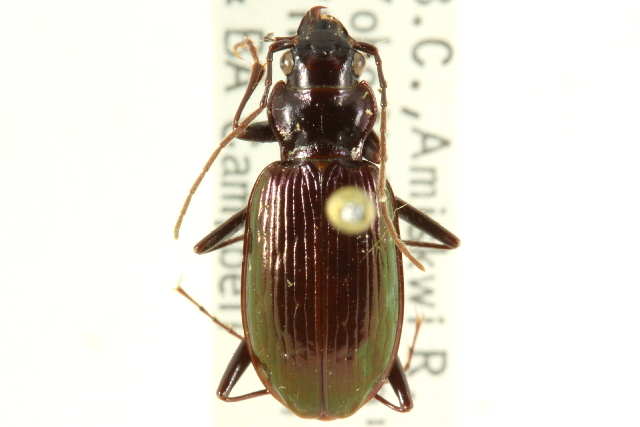
- Nebria gebleri gebleri
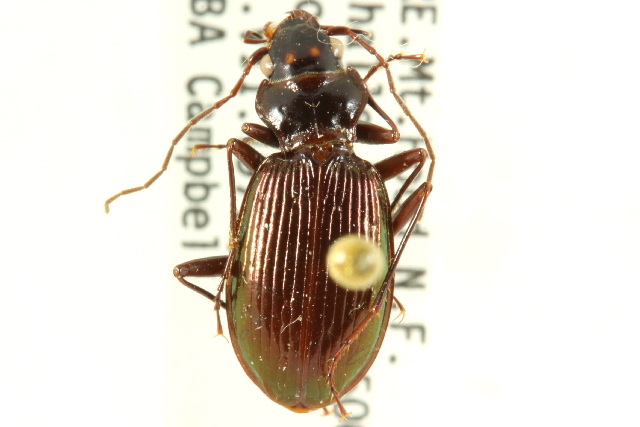
- Nebria gebleri cascadensis

Scientific classification
- Kingdom: Animalia
- Phylum: Arthropoda
- Class: Insecta
- Order: Coleoptera
- Suborder: Adephaga
- Family: Carabidae
- Genus: Nebria
- Species: N. gebleri

Binomial name
- Nebria gebleri Dejean, 1831

Synonyms
- Nebria melanaria Hatch, 1949; Nebria rathvoni LeConte, 1853

= Nebria gebleri =

Species of beetle

Nebria gebleri is a species of ground beetle in the family Carabidae. It is found in North America.

Adults are nocturnal and carnivorous.

== Subspecies ==
These six subspecies belong to the species Nebria gebleri:

- Nebria gebleri albimontis Kavanaugh, 1984 (California) - White Mountains gazelle beetle
- Nebria gebleri cascadensis Kavanaugh, 1979 (British Columbia, Oregon, Washington) - Cascade Mountains gazelle beetle
- Nebria gebleri fragariae Kavanaugh, 1979 (Oregon) - Strawberry Mountains gazelle beetle
- Nebria gebleri gebleri Dejean, 1831 (Alberta, British Columbia, Arkansas, Idaho, Montana, Oregon, Washington) - Gebler's gazelle beetle
- Nebria gebleri rathvoni LeConte, 1853 (California, Nevada) - Rathvon's gazelle beetle
- Nebria gebleri siskiyouensis Kavanaugh, 1979 (California, Oregon) - Siskiyou gazelle beetle

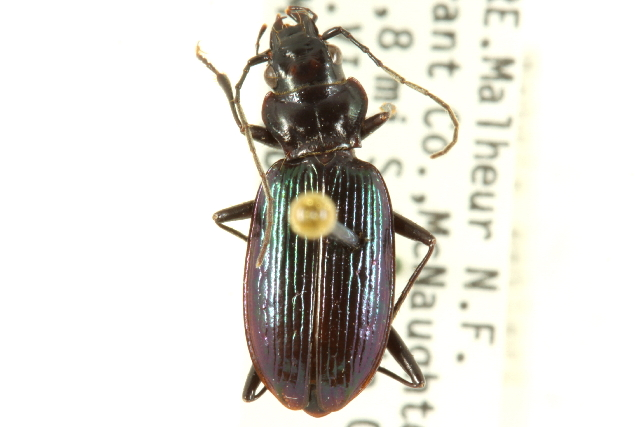
Nebria gebleri fragariae
