= Nebria bissenica =

Scientific classification
- Domain: Eukaryota
- Kingdom: Animalia
- Phylum: Arthropoda
- Class: Insecta
- Order: Coleoptera
- Suborder: Adephaga
- Family: Carabidae
- Genus: Nebria
- Species: N. bissenica

Binomial name
- Nebria bissenica Bielz, 1887

Synonyms
- Nebria basipes Reitter, 1887; Nebria heegeri Fuss, 1857

Species of beetle

Nebria bissenica is a species of ground beetle in the Nebriinae subfamily that is endemic to Romania. It is found in the Fagaras Mountains, along the edge of streams.

== Taxonomy ==
It was previously treated as a variety of Nebria reichei.
