= Nebria georgei =

Scientific classification
- Kingdom: Animalia
- Phylum: Arthropoda
- Class: Insecta
- Order: Coleoptera
- Suborder: Adephaga
- Family: Carabidae
- Genus: Nebria
- Species: N. georgei

Binomial name
- Nebria georgei Kavanaugh, 2006

Species of beetle

Nebria georgei is a species of beetle of the Carabidae family. This species is found the United States, where it has only been recorded from the riparian zone along the Colorado River in the Grand Canyon, Arizona.

== Etymology ==
This species is named in honour of George Eugene Ball, who first recognized specimens of this taxon as likely representing an undescribed species.
