= Nebria bellorum =

Scientific classification
- Kingdom: Animalia
- Phylum: Arthropoda
- Class: Insecta
- Order: Coleoptera
- Suborder: Adephaga
- Family: Carabidae
- Genus: Nebria
- Species: N. bellorum

Binomial name
- Nebria bellorum Kavanaugh, 1979

Synonyms
- Nebria lacustris bellorum

Species of beetle

Nebria bellorum, Bell's gazelle beetle, is a species of ground beetle in the family Carabidae. It is found in North America (North Carolina, Tennessee), where it is found in mid- to uplands areas on the banks of rivers and brooks.

Adults are nocturnal and carnivorous.

== Taxonomy ==
Some authors treat this species as a subspecies of Nebria lacustris.
