= Nebria hiekei =

Scientific classification
- Kingdom: Animalia
- Phylum: Arthropoda
- Class: Insecta
- Order: Coleoptera
- Suborder: Adephaga
- Family: Carabidae
- Genus: Nebria
- Species: N. hiekei

Binomial name
- Nebria hiekei Shilenkov, 1982

Species of beetle

Nebria hiekei is a species of black coloured beetle from a family Carabidae that is endemic to Qinghai, province of China.
