= Nebria commixta =

Scientific classification
- Domain: Eukaryota
- Kingdom: Animalia
- Phylum: Arthropoda
- Class: Insecta
- Order: Coleoptera
- Suborder: Adephaga
- Family: Carabidae
- Genus: Nebria
- Species: N. commixta

Binomial name
- Nebria commixta Chaudoir, 1850

Species of beetle

Nebria commixta is a species of black coloured ground beetle from Nebriinae subfamily that can be found in Armenia, Georgia, and Russia. The species is 14 millimetres (0.55 in) long.
