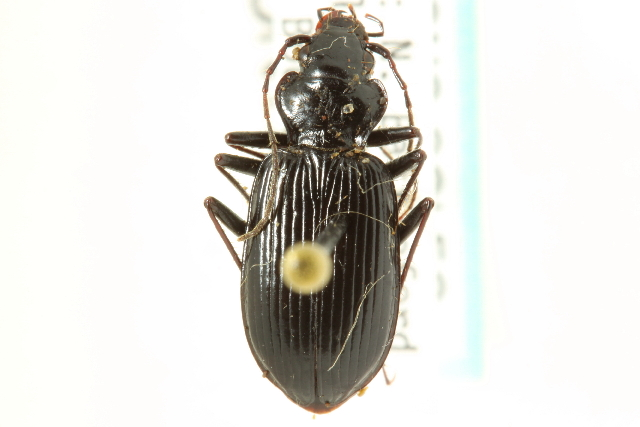

Scientific classification
- Domain: Eukaryota
- Kingdom: Animalia
- Phylum: Arthropoda
- Class: Insecta
- Order: Coleoptera
- Suborder: Adephaga
- Family: Carabidae
- Genus: Nebria
- Species: N. hudsonica

Binomial name
- Nebria hudsonica Leconte, 1863

= Nebria hudsonica =

Species of beetle

Nebria hudsonica, the Hudsonian Bay gazelle beetle, is a species of ground beetle in the family Carabidae. It is found in North America (Alberta, British Columbia, Manitoba, Northern Territories, Saskatchewan, Yukon, Alaska, Colorado, Idaho, Montana, Oregon, Utah, Washington, Wyoming), where is inhabits lowlands to mountainous areas. It is usually found on the banks of streams.

Adults are nocturnal and carnivorous.
