= Nebria dolicapax =

Scientific classification
- Kingdom: Animalia
- Phylum: Arthropoda
- Clade: Pancrustacea
- Class: Insecta
- Order: Coleoptera
- Suborder: Adephaga
- Family: Carabidae
- Genus: Nebria
- Species: N. dolicapax

Binomial name
- Nebria dolicapax Ledoux & Roux, 1992

Species of beetle

Nebria dolicapax is a species of ground beetle from Nebriinae family that is endemic to eastern China.
