= Nebria baicalopacifica =

Scientific classification
- Domain: Eukaryota
- Kingdom: Animalia
- Phylum: Arthropoda
- Class: Insecta
- Order: Coleoptera
- Suborder: Adephaga
- Family: Carabidae
- Genus: Nebria
- Species: N. baicalopacifica

Binomial name
- Nebria baicalopacifica Shilenkov, 2006

Species of beetle

Nebria baicalopacifica is a species of ground beetle in the Nebriinae subfamily that is endemic to Russia.

== Distribution ==
The species are found in northern part of Irkutsk and Khabarovsk cities of Buryat Republic.
