= Nebria angustata =

Scientific classification
- Kingdom: Animalia
- Phylum: Arthropoda
- Class: Insecta
- Order: Coleoptera
- Suborder: Adephaga
- Family: Carabidae
- Subfamily: Nebriinae
- Tribe: Nebriini
- Genus: Nebria
- Species: N. angustata

Binomial name
- Nebria angustata Dejean, 1831

Synonyms
- Oreonebria angustata Dejean, 1830; Nebria chevrierii Heer, 1837

Species of beetle

Nebria angustata is a species in the beetle family Carabidae. It is found in Switzerland and Italy.
