= Nebria hybrida =

Scientific classification
- Domain: Eukaryota
- Kingdom: Animalia
- Phylum: Arthropoda
- Class: Insecta
- Order: Coleoptera
- Suborder: Adephaga
- Family: Carabidae
- Genus: Nebria
- Species: N. hybrida

Binomial name
- Nebria hybrida Rottenberg, 1874

Synonyms
- Nebria pirinensis Horvatovich, 1973; Nebria rhodopensis Horvatovich, 1973

Species of beetle

Nebria hybrida is a species of ground beetle in the Nebriinae subfamily that is endemic to Bulgaria.
