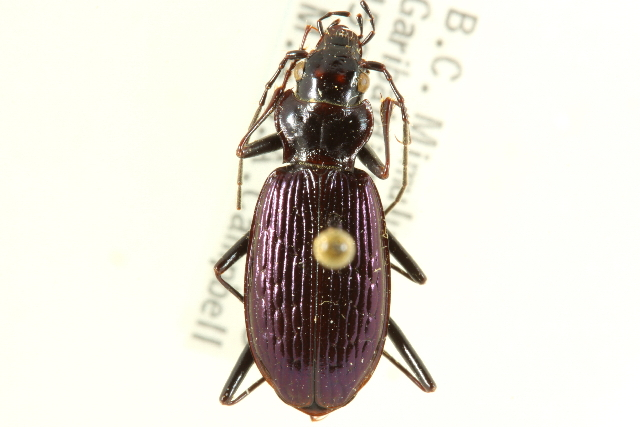

Scientific classification
- Domain: Eukaryota
- Kingdom: Animalia
- Phylum: Arthropoda
- Class: Insecta
- Order: Coleoptera
- Suborder: Adephaga
- Family: Carabidae
- Genus: Nebria
- Species: N. meanyi

Binomial name
- Nebria meanyi Van Dyke, 1925

= Nebria meanyi =

Species of beetle

Nebria meanyi, Meany's gazelle beetle, is a species of ground beetle in the Nebriinae subfamily that can be found in Canada and in the U.S. states such as California, Oregon, and Washington, as well as British Columbia and Yukon. It is found near mountain streams.

Adults are nocturnal and carnivorous.
