= Nebria macrogona =

Scientific classification
- Domain: Eukaryota
- Kingdom: Animalia
- Phylum: Arthropoda
- Class: Insecta
- Order: Coleoptera
- Suborder: Adephaga
- Family: Carabidae
- Genus: Nebria
- Subgenus: Nebria (Paranebria)
- Species: N. macrogona

Binomial name
- Nebria macrogona Bates, 1873

Species of beetle

Nebria macrogona is a species of ground beetle in the subfamily Nebriinae that is endemic to Japan.
