= Nebria jeffreyi =

Scientific classification
- Kingdom: Animalia
- Phylum: Arthropoda
- Class: Insecta
- Order: Coleoptera
- Suborder: Adephaga
- Family: Carabidae
- Genus: Nebria
- Species: N. jeffreyi

Binomial name
- Nebria jeffreyi Kavanaugh, 1984

Species of beetle

Nebria jeffreyi, Jeffrey's gazelle beetle, is a species of ground beetle in the genus Nebria and the subfamily Nebriinae that is endemic to the US state of Oregon, where it inhabits the banks of rivers and brooks in the uplands to the mountains.

Adults are nocturnal and carnivorous.
