= Nebria medvedevi =

Scientific classification
- Domain: Eukaryota
- Kingdom: Animalia
- Phylum: Arthropoda
- Class: Insecta
- Order: Coleoptera
- Suborder: Adephaga
- Family: Carabidae
- Genus: Nebria
- Species: N. medvedevi

Binomial name
- Nebria medvedevi Shilenkov, 1982

Species of beetle

Nebria medvedevi is a species of beetle of the Carabidae family. This species is found in Russia (Ukok Highland) and Mongolia (Altai Mountains).

Adults have been found under rocks along temporary brooks.
