= Nebria heydenii =

Scientific classification
- Kingdom: Animalia
- Phylum: Arthropoda
- Class: Insecta
- Order: Coleoptera
- Suborder: Adephaga
- Family: Carabidae
- Subfamily: Nebriinae
- Tribe: Nebriini
- Genus: Nebria
- Species: N. heydenii

Binomial name
- Nebria heydenii Dejean, 1831

Species of beetle

Nebria heydenii is a species in the beetle family Carabidae. It is native to Greece.
