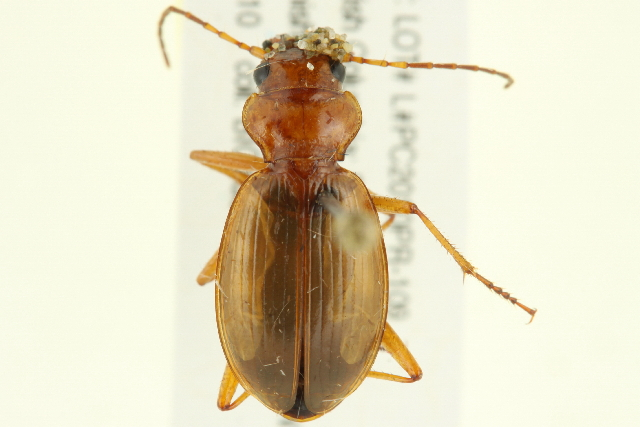

Scientific classification
- Domain: Eukaryota
- Kingdom: Animalia
- Phylum: Arthropoda
- Class: Insecta
- Order: Coleoptera
- Suborder: Adephaga
- Family: Carabidae
- Genus: Nebria
- Species: N. diversa

Binomial name
- Nebria diversa LeConte, 1863

Synonyms
- Nebria townsendi Casey, 1924; Nebria livida LeConte, 1859

= Nebria diversa =

Species of beetle

Nebria diversa, the sea beach gazelle beetle, is a species of beetle from family Carabidae found in Canada and such US states as California, Oregon, and Washington, where it is found on open sandy sea beaches beneath driftwood and other debris.

Adults are brachypterous, nocturnal and carnivorous.
