= Nebria torosa =

Scientific classification
- Kingdom: Animalia
- Phylum: Arthropoda
- Class: Insecta
- Order: Coleoptera
- Suborder: Adephaga
- Family: Carabidae
- Genus: Nebria
- Species: N. torosa

Binomial name
- Nebria torosa Ledoux, Roux & Sciaky, 1994

Species of beetle

Nebria torosa is a species of ground beetle in the Nebriinae subfamily that can be found in Qinghai province of China.
