= Nebria murzini =

Scientific classification
- Kingdom: Animalia
- Phylum: Arthropoda
- Class: Insecta
- Order: Coleoptera
- Suborder: Adephaga
- Family: Carabidae
- Genus: Nebria
- Species: N. murzini

Binomial name
- Nebria murzini Ledoux & Roux, 2000

Species of beetle

Nebria murzini is a species of beetle of the Carabidae family. This species is found in Xinjiang, China.

== Subspecies ==
- Nebria murzini murzini
- Nebria murzini cheni Ledoux & Roux, 2007
