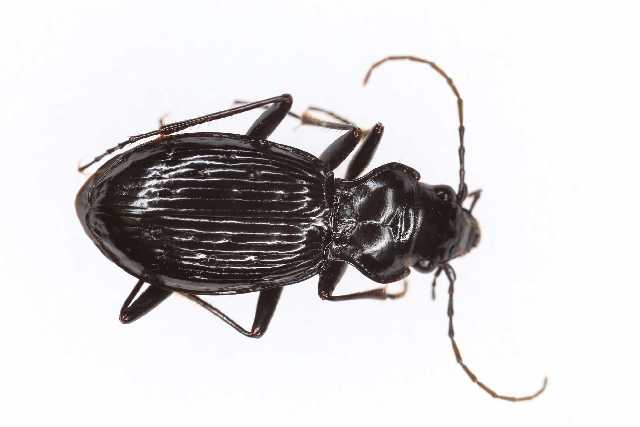

Scientific classification
- Kingdom: Animalia
- Phylum: Arthropoda
- Clade: Pancrustacea
- Class: Insecta
- Order: Coleoptera
- Suborder: Adephaga
- Family: Carabidae
- Subfamily: Nebriinae
- Tribe: Nebriini
- Genus: Nebria
- Species: N. fasciatopunctata

Binomial name
- Nebria fasciatopunctata L. Miller, 1850

Synonyms
- Nebria weingaertneri Reitter, 1917

= Nebria fasciatopunctata =

Species of beetle

Nebria fasciatopunctata is a species of ground beetle in the Nebriinae subfamily that can be found in Austria, Croatia, and Slovenia.
