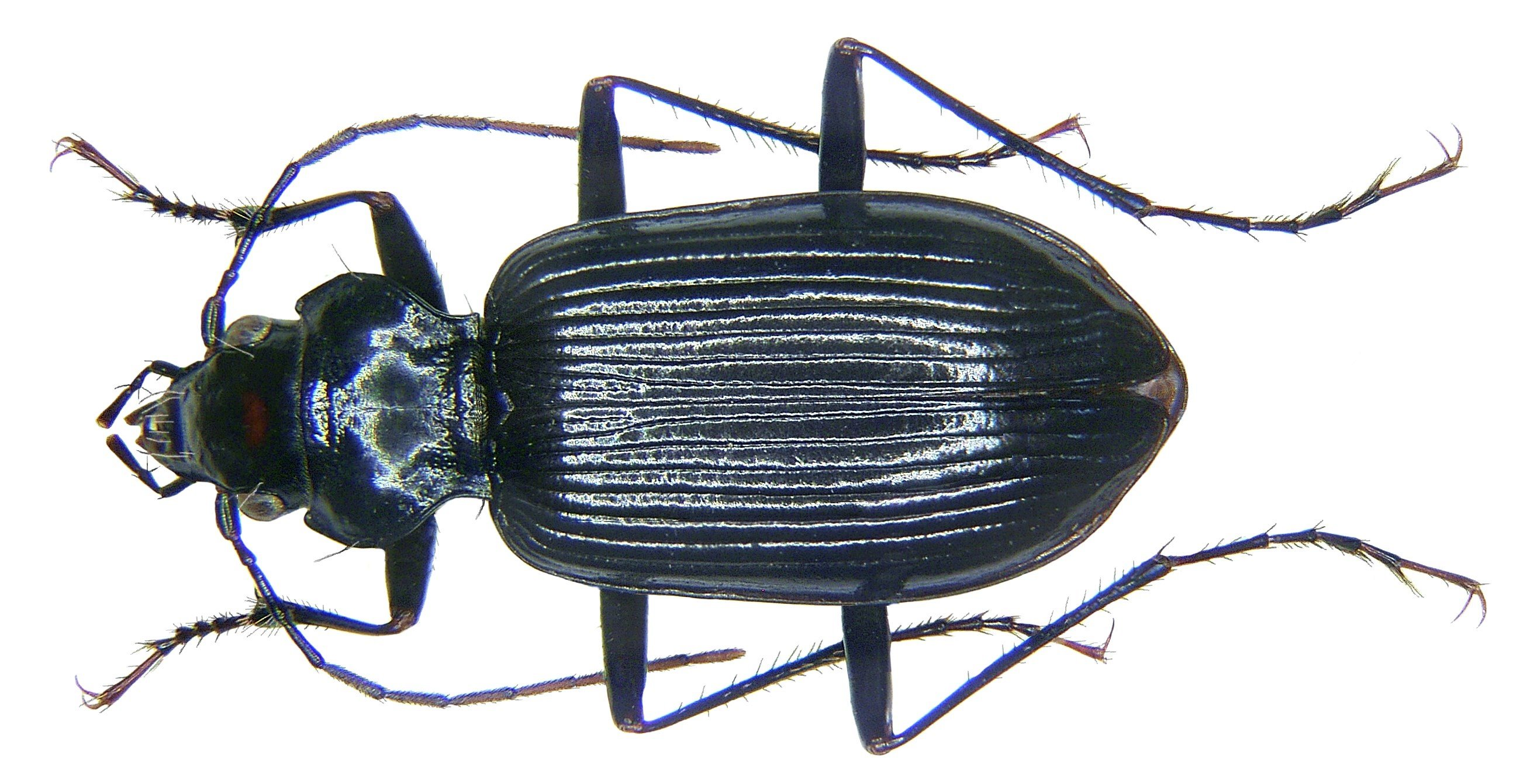
- Nebria jockischii

Scientific classification
- Domain: Eukaryota
- Kingdom: Animalia
- Phylum: Arthropoda
- Class: Insecta
- Order: Coleoptera
- Suborder: Adephaga
- Family: Carabidae
- Subfamily: Nebriinae
- Tribe: Nebriini
- Genus: Nebria
- Species: N. jockischii

Binomial name
- Nebria jockischii Sturm, 1815

Synonyms
- Nebria merkliana Apfelbeck, 1904; Nebria parreyssii Chaudoir, 1843; Nebria nigricornis A. & G.B.Villa, 1833; Nebria hornschuchi Sturm, 1826; Nebria aterrima Fiori, 1896; Nebria nigriceps Schilsky, 1888

= Nebria jockischii =

Species of beetle

Nebria jockischii is a species in the beetle family Carabidae. It is found in Europe (France, Germany, Switzerland, Austria, Czechia, Slovakia, Poland, Ukraine, Spain, Italy, Slovenia, former Yugoslavia, North Macedonia, Albania, Greece, Bulgaria and Romania).

Adults are black with shiny elytra. The size of the species varies according to the altitude it is found, ranging from 13-14 mm at low altitudes to 7-8 mm at mountain summits.

== Subspecies ==
These four subspecies belong to the species Nebria jockischii:

- Nebria jockischii bolivari Jeanne, 1966 (Spain)
- Nebria jockischii hoepfneri Dejean, 1826 (France, Germany, Switzerland, Austria, Czechia, Slovakia, Poland, Ukraine, Spain, Italy, Slovenia, former Yugoslavia, North Macedonia, Albania, Greece, Bulgaria, Romania)
- Nebria jockischii jockischii Sturm, 1815 (France, Germany, Switzerland, Austria)
- Nebria jockischii orensis Breit, 1914 (Spain)

The species Nebria hornschuchi Sturm, 1826, Nebria merkliana Apfelbeck, 1904, Nebria nigricornis Villa, 1833, and Nebria parreyssii Chaudoir, 1843 are now considered taxonomic synonyms of the subspecies Nebria jockischii hoepfneri.
