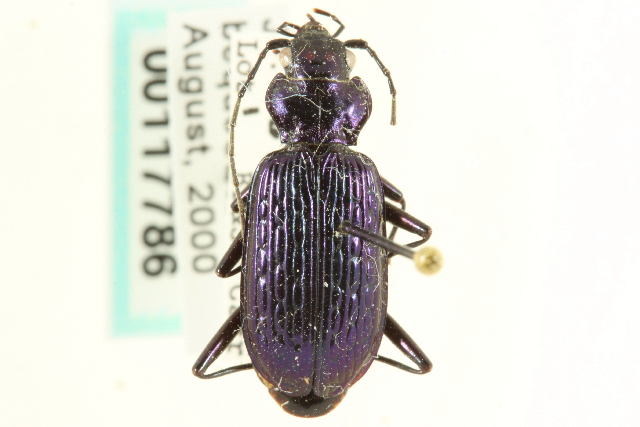
- Nebria schwarzi schwarzi
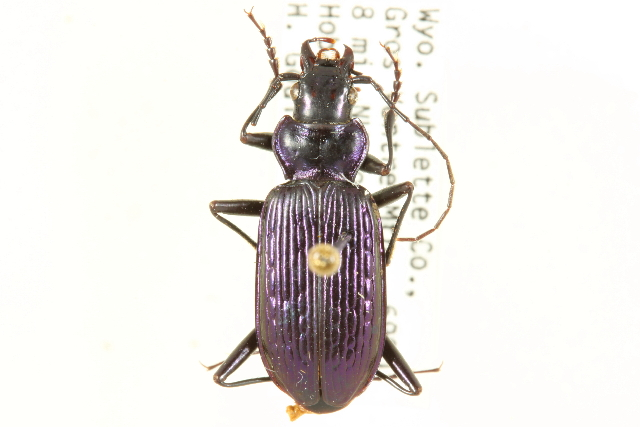
- Nebria schwarzi beverlianna

Scientific classification
- Domain: Eukaryota
- Kingdom: Animalia
- Phylum: Arthropoda
- Class: Insecta
- Order: Coleoptera
- Suborder: Adephaga
- Family: Carabidae
- Genus: Nebria
- Species: N. schwarzi

Binomial name
- Nebria schwarzi Van Dyke, 1925

= Nebria schwarzi =

Species of beetle

Nebria schwarzi is a species of ground beetle in the family Carabidae. It is found in North America.

== Subspecies ==
These subspecies belong to the species Nebria schwarzi:

- Nebria schwarzi schwarzi (Alberta, British Columbia) - Schwarz's gazelle beetle
- Nebria schwarzi beverlianna Kavanaugh, 1979 (Wyoming) - Beverly Ann's gazelle beetle
