= Nebria coloradensis =

Scientific classification
- Domain: Eukaryota
- Kingdom: Animalia
- Phylum: Arthropoda
- Class: Insecta
- Order: Coleoptera
- Suborder: Adephaga
- Family: Carabidae
- Genus: Nebria
- Species: N. coloradensis

Binomial name
- Nebria coloradensis Van Dyke, 1943

Species of beetle

Nebria coloradensis, the Colorado gazelle beetle, is a species of ground beetle in the family Carabidae. It is found in North America (Colorado), where it inhabits mountainous areas on wet ground.

Adults are brachypterous, nocturnal and carnivorous.
