= Nebria elliptipennis =

Scientific classification
- Kingdom: Animalia
- Phylum: Arthropoda
- Class: Insecta
- Order: Coleoptera
- Suborder: Adephaga
- Family: Carabidae
- Genus: Nebria
- Species: N. elliptipennis

Binomial name
- Nebria elliptipennis Bates, 1874

Species of beetle

Nebria elliptipennis is a species of ground beetle from Nebriinae subfamily that is endemic to Turkey.
