= Nebria uralensis =

Scientific classification
- Domain: Eukaryota
- Kingdom: Animalia
- Phylum: Arthropoda
- Class: Insecta
- Order: Coleoptera
- Suborder: Adephaga
- Family: Carabidae
- Genus: Nebria
- Species: N. uralensis

Binomial name
- Nebria uralensis Glasunov, 1901

Species of beetle

Nebria uralensis is a species of black coloured ground beetle in the Nebriinae subfamily that can be found Russia and the Palearctic realm.
