= Nebria gouleti =

Scientific classification
- Kingdom: Animalia
- Phylum: Arthropoda
- Class: Insecta
- Order: Coleoptera
- Suborder: Adephaga
- Family: Carabidae
- Genus: Nebria
- Species: N. gouleti

Binomial name
- Nebria gouleti Kavanaugh, 1979

Species of beetle

Nebria gouleti, or Goulet's gazelle beetle, is a species of beetle of the Carabidae family. This species is found in Idaho, Oregon and Washington, where it inhabits riverbanks and banks of brooks, and may also be found near waterfalls.

Adults are nocturnal and carnivorous.
