= Nebria reflexa =

Scientific classification
- Domain: Eukaryota
- Kingdom: Animalia
- Phylum: Arthropoda
- Class: Insecta
- Order: Coleoptera
- Suborder: Adephaga
- Family: Carabidae
- Genus: Nebria
- Species: N. reflexa

Binomial name
- Nebria reflexa Bates, 1883

Synonyms
- Nebria hikosana

Species of beetle

Nebria reflexa is a species of ground beetle in the Nebriinae subfamily that is endemic to Japan.

== Subspecies ==
These two subspecies belong to the species Nebria reflexa:

- Nebria reflexa hikosana Habu, 1956 (Japan)
- Nebria reflexa reflexa Bates, 1883 (Japan)
