= Nebria bosnica =

Scientific classification
- Domain: Eukaryota
- Kingdom: Animalia
- Phylum: Arthropoda
- Class: Insecta
- Order: Coleoptera
- Suborder: Adephaga
- Family: Carabidae
- Genus: Nebria
- Species: N. bosnica

Binomial name
- Nebria bosnica Ganglbauer, 1889

Synonyms
- Nebria cvrsnicensis Horvatovich, 1974; Nebria szelenyii Horvatovich, 1974; Nebria prenjensis Horvatovich, 1974; Nebria zelengorica Horvatovich, 1974

Species of beetle

Nebria bosnica is a species of beetle of the Carabidae family. This species is found in Bosnia-Herzegovina, former Yugoslavia, Montenegro, Kosovo and Albania, where it inhabits high montane areas.

== Subspecies ==
- Nebria bosnica bosnica (Bosnia-Herzegovina)
- Nebria bosnica apfelbecki Ganglbauer, 1891 (Bosnia-Herzegovina, former Yugoslavia, Montenegro)
- Nebria bosnica jezercensis Horvatovich, 1974 (Albania)
- Nebria bosnica kulti Maran, 1939 (Albania)
- Nebria bosnica lovcenica C.Huber, 2001 (former Yugoslavia, Montenegro)
- Nebria bosnica prokletiensis Horvatovich, 1974 (former Yugoslavia, Montenegro, Kosovo, Albania)
- Nebria bosnica spelaeophila Obenberger, 1917 (former Yugoslavia, Montenegro)
- Nebria bosnica sturanyi Apfelbeck, 1906 (former Yugoslavia, Montenegro, Albania)
- Nebria bosnica tresnjevikensis Horvatovich, 1974 (former Yugoslavia, Montenegro)
