= Nebria quezeli =

Scientific classification
- Domain: Eukaryota
- Kingdom: Animalia
- Phylum: Arthropoda
- Class: Insecta
- Order: Coleoptera
- Suborder: Adephaga
- Family: Carabidae
- Genus: Nebria
- Species: N. quezeli

Binomial name
- Nebria quezeli Verdier, 1953

Species of beetle

Nebria quezeli is a species of ground beetle in the Nebriinae subfamily that is endemic to northern part of Morocco.
