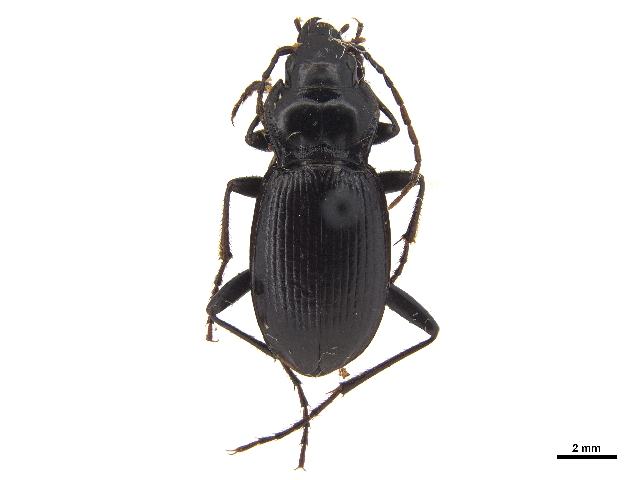

Scientific classification
- Kingdom: Animalia
- Phylum: Arthropoda
- Class: Insecta
- Order: Coleoptera
- Suborder: Adephaga
- Family: Carabidae
- Genus: Nebria
- Species: N. asturiensis

Binomial name
- Nebria asturiensis Bruneau de Mire, 1964

= Nebria asturiensis =

Species of beetle

Nebria asturiensis is a species of ground beetle from Nebriinae subfamily that is endemic to Spain.
