= Nebria merditana =

Scientific classification
- Kingdom: Animalia
- Phylum: Arthropoda
- Class: Insecta
- Order: Coleoptera
- Suborder: Adephaga
- Family: Carabidae
- Genus: Nebria
- Species: N. merditana

Binomial name
- Nebria merditana Apfelbeck, 1906

Synonyms
- Nebria zebiaensis Horvatovich, 1975

Species of beetle

Nebria merditana is a species of beetle of the Carabidae family. This species is found in Albania.
