= Nebria rhilensis =

Scientific classification
- Domain: Eukaryota
- Kingdom: Animalia
- Phylum: Arthropoda
- Class: Insecta
- Order: Coleoptera
- Suborder: Adephaga
- Family: Carabidae
- Genus: Nebria
- Species: N. rhilensis

Binomial name
- Nebria rhilensis J. Frivaldszky, 1879

Species of beetle

Nebria rhilensis is a species of beetle in the family Carabidae that is endemic to the Rila mountain range, Bulgaria.
