= Nebria sobrina =

Scientific classification
- Kingdom: Animalia
- Phylum: Arthropoda
- Class: Insecta
- Order: Coleoptera
- Suborder: Adephaga
- Family: Carabidae
- Subfamily: Nebriinae
- Tribe: Nebriini
- Genus: Nebria
- Species: N. sobrina

Binomial name
- Nebria sobrina Schaufuss, 1862

Species of beetle

Nebria sobrina is a species in the beetle family Carabidae. It is found in Spain.

== Subspecies ==
These three subspecies belong to the species Nebria sobrina:

- Nebria sobrina sinuata Bruneau de Miré, 1964 (Spain)
- Nebria sobrina sobrina L.Schaufuss, 1862 (Spain)
- Nebria sobrina ubinensis Bruneau de Miré, 1964 (Spain)
