= Nebria rotundicollis =

Scientific classification
- Domain: Eukaryota
- Kingdom: Animalia
- Phylum: Arthropoda
- Class: Insecta
- Order: Coleoptera
- Suborder: Adephaga
- Family: Carabidae
- Genus: Nebria
- Species: N. rotundicollis

Binomial name
- Nebria rotundicollis Heinz & Roux, 1989

Species of beetle

Nebria rotundicollis is a subspecies of ground beetle in the Nebriinae subfamily that is endemic to Pakistan. Both of it subspecies, Nebria rotundicollis rotundicollis and Nebria rotundicollis tenulis are endemic to the same country.
