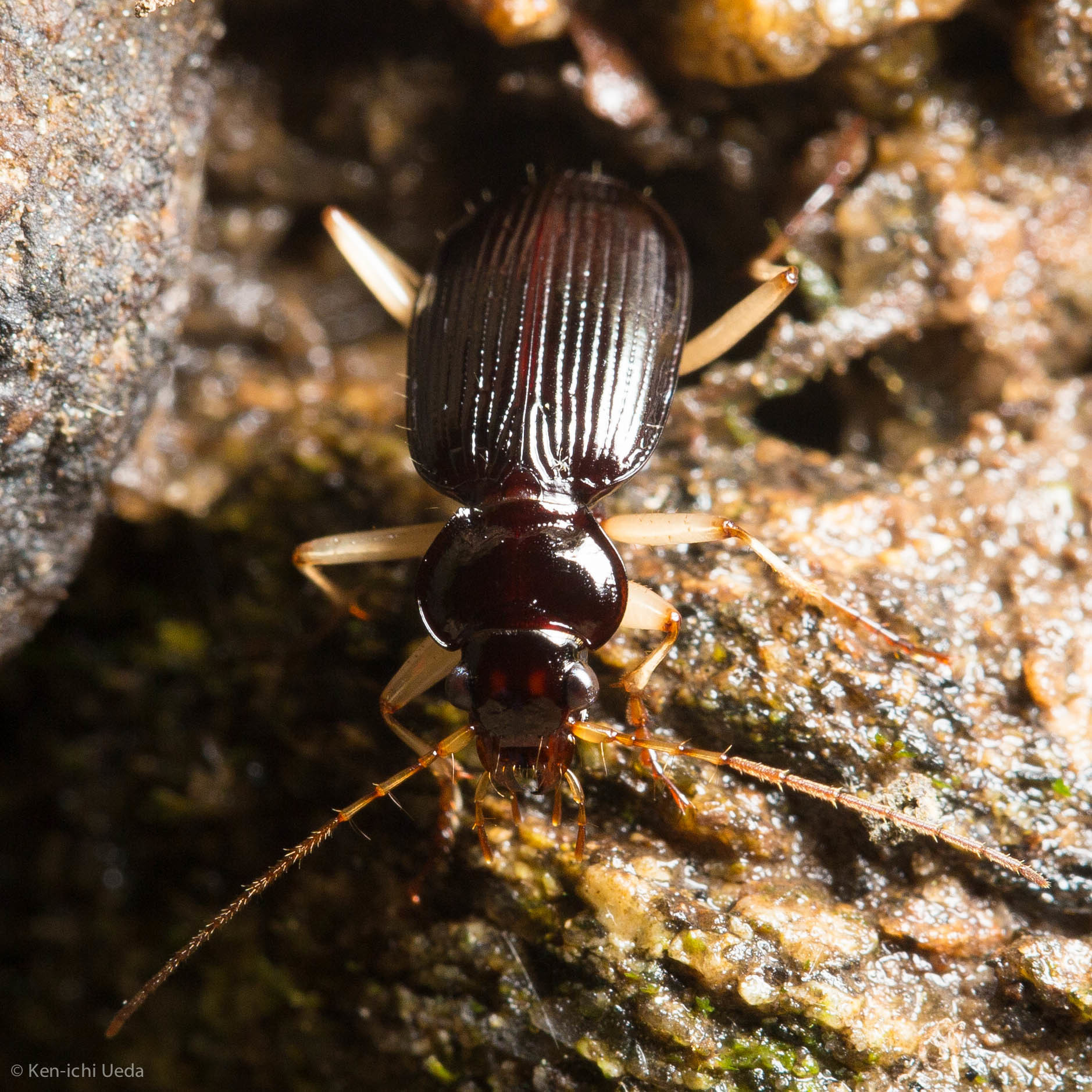

Scientific classification
- Domain: Eukaryota
- Kingdom: Animalia
- Phylum: Arthropoda
- Class: Insecta
- Order: Coleoptera
- Suborder: Adephaga
- Family: Carabidae
- Genus: Nebria
- Species: N. pallipes

Binomial name
- Nebria pallipes Say, 1823

Synonyms
- Nebria muehlenbergii Sturm, 1826

= Nebria pallipes =

Species of beetle

Nebria pallipes, the pale-legged gazelle beetle, is a species of beetle in the family Carabidae found in eastern North America, where it is found from lowland to upland areas.

Adults are gregarious, nocturnal and carnivorous.

== Description ==
Both sexes are black coloured with orange legs, with males bigger than females.
