= Nebria genei =

Scientific classification
- Domain: Eukaryota
- Kingdom: Animalia
- Phylum: Arthropoda
- Class: Insecta
- Order: Coleoptera
- Suborder: Adephaga
- Family: Carabidae
- Subfamily: Nebriinae
- Tribe: Nebriini
- Genus: Nebria
- Species: N. genei

Binomial name
- Nebria genei Gené, 1839

Species of beetle

Nebria genei is a species of ground beetle in the Nebriinae subfamily that is endemic to the island of Sardinia.
