= Nebria elbursiaca =

Scientific classification
- Kingdom: Animalia
- Phylum: Arthropoda
- Clade: Pancrustacea
- Class: Insecta
- Order: Coleoptera
- Suborder: Adephaga
- Family: Carabidae
- Genus: Nebria
- Species: N. elbursiaca

Binomial name
- Nebria elbursiaca B. Bodemeyer, 1927

Species of beetle

Nebria elbursiaca is a species of ground beetle in the Nebriinae subfamily that is endemic to Iran.

== Subspecies ==
The species have 2 subspecies all of which are endemic to Iran:

- Nebria elbursiaca bagrovdaghensis Shilenkov, 1983
- Nebria elbursiaca elbursiaca B. Bodemeyer, 1927
