= Nebria stanislavi =

Scientific classification
- Domain: Eukaryota
- Kingdom: Animalia
- Phylum: Arthropoda
- Class: Insecta
- Order: Coleoptera
- Suborder: Adephaga
- Family: Carabidae
- Genus: Nebria
- Species: N. stanislavi

Binomial name
- Nebria stanislavi Dudko & Matalin, 2002

Species of beetle

Nebria stanislavi is a species of beetle of the Carabidae family. This species is found in Russia, where it has only been recorded from the Kyzylart Range. Here, it inhabits stony screes along shores of circle lakes.

Adults males have a size of 8.4–10.4 mm, while females are somewhat larger (9.6–11.2 mm). They have a shining black body.

== Etymology ==
The species is named for S.S. Demidov, who took part in the expedition together with A.V. Matalin and collected a part of the type series.
