= Nebria dejeanii =

Scientific classification
- Kingdom: Animalia
- Phylum: Arthropoda
- Class: Insecta
- Order: Coleoptera
- Suborder: Adephaga
- Family: Carabidae
- Genus: Nebria
- Species: N. dejeanii

Binomial name
- Nebria dejeanii (Dejean, 1826)

Species of beetle

Nebria dejeanii is a species of ground beetle in the Nebriinae subfamily that is endemic to Austria.
