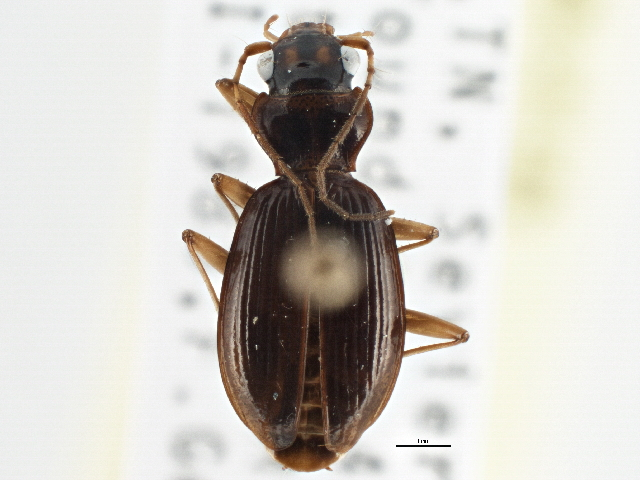

Scientific classification
- Domain: Eukaryota
- Kingdom: Animalia
- Phylum: Arthropoda
- Class: Insecta
- Order: Coleoptera
- Suborder: Adephaga
- Family: Carabidae
- Genus: Nebria
- Species: N. appalachia

Binomial name
- Nebria appalachia Darlington, 1932

= Nebria appalachia =

Species of beetle

Nebria appalachia, the southern Appalachian gazelle beetle, is a species of ground beetle in the family Carabidae. It is found in North America (North Carolina and Tennessee), where it inhabits mid- to upland mixed forests. It is found on the banks of forest streams on wet, gravelly ground.

Adults are brachypterous.
