= Nebria marginata =

Scientific classification
- Kingdom: Animalia
- Phylum: Arthropoda
- Clade: Pancrustacea
- Class: Insecta
- Order: Coleoptera
- Suborder: Adephaga
- Family: Carabidae
- Genus: Nebria
- Species: N. marginata

Binomial name
- Nebria marginata Ledoux & Roux, 1995

Species of beetle

Nebria marginata is a species of ground beetle in the Nebriinae subfamily that is found in the Xinjiang province of China, as well as Kazakhstan.
