= Nebria tetungi =

Scientific classification
- Kingdom: Animalia
- Phylum: Arthropoda
- Class: Insecta
- Order: Coleoptera
- Suborder: Adephaga
- Family: Carabidae
- Genus: Nebria
- Species: N. tetungi

Binomial name
- Nebria tetungi Shilenkov, 1982

Species of beetle

Nebria tetungi is a species of ground beetle in the Nebriinae subfamily that can be found in Gansu, Qinghai, and Sichuan provinces of China.
