= Nebria chitralensis =

Scientific classification
- Domain: Eukaryota
- Kingdom: Animalia
- Phylum: Arthropoda
- Class: Insecta
- Order: Coleoptera
- Suborder: Adephaga
- Family: Carabidae
- Genus: Nebria
- Species: N. chitralensis

Binomial name
- Nebria chitralensis Shilenkov & Heinz, 1988

Species of ground beetle

Nebria chitralensis is a species of ground beetle in the Nebriinae subfamily that is endemic to Pakistan.
