= Nebria pulcherrima =

Scientific classification
- Domain: Eukaryota
- Kingdom: Animalia
- Phylum: Arthropoda
- Class: Insecta
- Order: Coleoptera
- Suborder: Adephaga
- Family: Carabidae
- Genus: Nebria
- Species: N. pulcherrima

Binomial name
- Nebria pulcherrima Bates, 1873

Species of beetle

Nebria pulcherrima is a species of beetle in the family Carabidae found in Chinese province of Jiangxi and Japan. Subspecies Nebria pulcherrima pulcherrima is found in the same countries.
