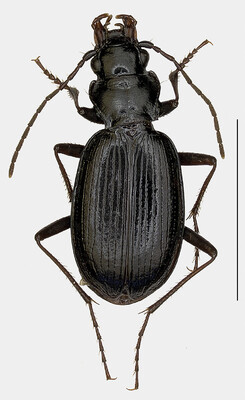

Scientific classification
- Domain: Eukaryota
- Kingdom: Animalia
- Phylum: Arthropoda
- Class: Insecta
- Order: Coleoptera
- Suborder: Adephaga
- Family: Carabidae
- Genus: Nebria
- Species: N. tsambagarov

Binomial name
- Nebria tsambagarov C.Huber & Schnitter, 2020

= Nebria tsambagarov =

Species of beetle

Nebria tsambagarov is a species of beetle of the Carabidae family. This species is found at alpine altitudes in the Mongolian Altai, where it can be found under big stones along the riverbanks of small rivulets.

Adults have a length of 7.5–9 mm and the dorsal surface is black, as is the head.

== Etymology ==
The specific epithet refers to the type locality, the Tsambagarav uul.
