= Nebria arcensis =

Scientific classification
- Kingdom: Animalia
- Phylum: Arthropoda
- Clade: Pancrustacea
- Class: Insecta
- Order: Coleoptera
- Suborder: Adephaga
- Family: Carabidae
- Genus: Nebria
- Species: N. arcensis

Binomial name
- Nebria arcensis Ledoux & Roux, 1990

Species of beetle

Nebria arcensis is a species of ground beetle in the Nebriinae subfamily that is endemic to Turkey.
