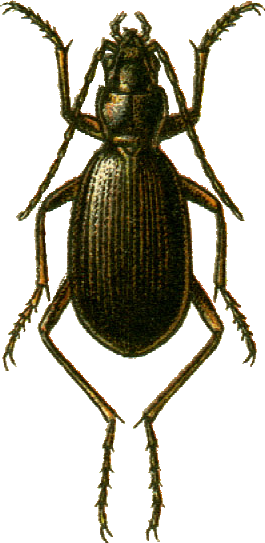

Scientific classification
- Domain: Eukaryota
- Kingdom: Animalia
- Phylum: Arthropoda
- Class: Insecta
- Order: Coleoptera
- Suborder: Adephaga
- Family: Carabidae
- Genus: Nebria
- Species: N. caucasica

Binomial name
- Nebria caucasica Ménétriés, 1832

= Nebria caucasica =

Species of beetle

Nebria caucasica is a species of ground beetle from the Nebriinae subfamily that is endemic to Caucasus.
