= Nebria ferganensis =

Scientific classification
- Domain: Eukaryota
- Kingdom: Animalia
- Phylum: Arthropoda
- Class: Insecta
- Order: Coleoptera
- Suborder: Adephaga
- Family: Carabidae
- Genus: Nebria
- Species: N. ferganensis

Binomial name
- Nebria ferganensis Shilenkov, 1982

Species of beetle

Nebria ferganensis is a species of ground beetle in the Nebriinae subfamily that is endemic to Kyrgyzstan.

== Subspecies ==
The species bears 2 subspecies all of whom are endemic to Kyrgyzstan:

- Nebria ferganensis ferganensis Shilenkov, 1982
- Nebria ferganensis urumbashi Kabak & Putchkov, 1996
