= Nebria nana =

Scientific classification
- Kingdom: Animalia
- Phylum: Arthropoda
- Clade: Pancrustacea
- Class: Insecta
- Order: Coleoptera
- Suborder: Adephaga
- Family: Carabidae
- Genus: Nebria
- Species: N. nana

Binomial name
- Nebria nana Ledoux & Roux, 1996

Species of beetle

Nebria nana is a species of ground beetle in the Nebriinae subfamily that can be found in Qinghai province of China and Tibet.
