= Nebria chaslii =

Scientific classification
- Kingdom: Animalia
- Phylum: Arthropoda
- Class: Insecta
- Order: Coleoptera
- Suborder: Adephaga
- Family: Carabidae
- Subfamily: Nebriinae
- Tribe: Nebriini
- Genus: Nebria
- Species: N. chaslii

Binomial name
- Nebria chaslii Fairmaire, 1886

Synonyms
- Nebria chasli

Species of beetle

Nebria chaslii is a species of ground beetle from Nebriinae subfamily that is endemic to Jiangxi province of China.
