= Nebria biseriata =

Scientific classification
- Domain: Eukaryota
- Kingdom: Animalia
- Phylum: Arthropoda
- Class: Insecta
- Order: Coleoptera
- Suborder: Adephaga
- Family: Carabidae
- Genus: Nebria
- Species: N. biseriata

Binomial name
- Nebria biseriata Lutshnik, 1915

Species of beetle

Nebria biseriata is a species of ground beetle in the Nebriinae subfamily that can be found in North Korea, China and Amur Oblast of Russia.
