= Nebria chinensis =

Scientific classification
- Domain: Eukaryota
- Kingdom: Animalia
- Phylum: Arthropoda
- Class: Insecta
- Order: Coleoptera
- Suborder: Adephaga
- Family: Carabidae
- Genus: Nebria
- Species: N. chelmosensis

Binomial name
- Nebria chelmosensis Bates, 1872

Synonyms
- Nebria lividipes Fairmaire, 1886; Nebria tsushimae Habu, 1981

Species of beetle

Nebria chelmosensis is a species of black coloured ground beetle from Nebriinae subfamily that can be found in Japan, North and South Korea, as well as in Jiangsu province of China.
