= Nebria dilatata =

Scientific classification
- Kingdom: Animalia
- Phylum: Arthropoda
- Clade: Pancrustacea
- Class: Insecta
- Order: Coleoptera
- Suborder: Adephaga
- Family: Carabidae
- Genus: Nebria
- Species: N. dilatata

Binomial name
- Nebria dilatata Dejean, 1826

Species of beetle

Nebria dilatata is a species of ground beetle in the Nebriinae subfamily that is endemic to Canary Islands.
