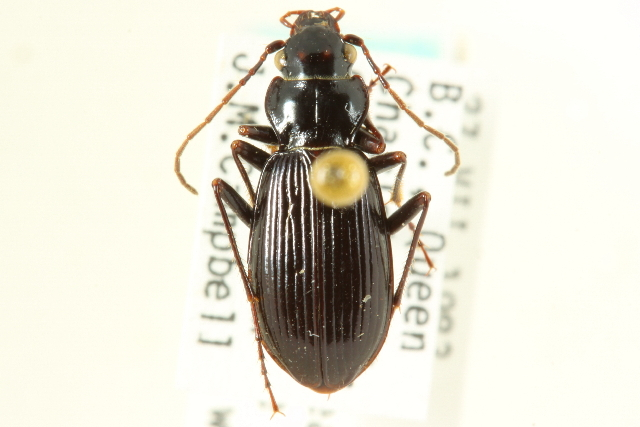

Scientific classification
- Kingdom: Animalia
- Phylum: Arthropoda
- Clade: Pancrustacea
- Class: Insecta
- Order: Coleoptera
- Suborder: Adephaga
- Family: Carabidae
- Genus: Nebria
- Species: N. haida

Binomial name
- Nebria haida Kavanaugh, 1984

= Nebria haida =

Species of beetle

Nebria haida, the haida gazelle beetle, is a species of beetle from family Carabidae that is endemic to Canada, found only on Haida Gwaii in BC, where it is found in the alpine zone.

Adults are brachypterous, nocturnal and carnivorous.
