= Nebria simulator =

Scientific classification
- Domain: Eukaryota
- Kingdom: Animalia
- Phylum: Arthropoda
- Class: Insecta
- Order: Coleoptera
- Suborder: Adephaga
- Family: Carabidae
- Genus: Nebria
- Species: N. simulator

Binomial name
- Nebria simulator Banninger, 1933

Species of beetle

Nebria simulator is a species of ground beetle in the Nebriinae subfamily that is endemic to North Korea.
