= Nebria fuscipes =

Scientific classification
- Domain: Eukaryota
- Kingdom: Animalia
- Phylum: Arthropoda
- Class: Insecta
- Order: Coleoptera
- Suborder: Adephaga
- Family: Carabidae
- Genus: Nebria
- Species: N. fuscipes

Binomial name
- Nebria fuscipes Fuss, 1850

Synonyms
- Nebria fussii Bielz, 1850; Nebria rivosa L. Miller 1868

Species of beetle

Nebria fuscipes is a species of ground beetle in the Nebriinae subfamily that can be found in Hungary, Poland, Romania, Slovakia, and Ukraine. The species is black coloured and is 13 millimetres (0.51 in) long.
