= Nebria vseteckai =

Scientific classification
- Domain: Eukaryota
- Kingdom: Animalia
- Phylum: Arthropoda
- Class: Insecta
- Order: Coleoptera
- Suborder: Adephaga
- Family: Carabidae
- Genus: Nebria
- Species: N. vseteckai

Binomial name
- Nebria vseteckai Maran, 1938

Species of beetle

Nebria vseteckai is a species of ground beetle from Nebriinae subfamily that is endemic to Greece.
