= Nebria setulata =

Scientific classification
- Kingdom: Animalia
- Phylum: Arthropoda
- Class: Insecta
- Order: Coleoptera
- Suborder: Adephaga
- Family: Carabidae
- Genus: Nebria
- Species: N. setulata

Binomial name
- Nebria setulata Ledoux & Roux, 1995

Species of beetle

Nebria setulata is a species of beetle of the Carabidae family. This species is found in China.
