= Nebria snowi =

Scientific classification
- Domain: Eukaryota
- Kingdom: Animalia
- Phylum: Arthropoda
- Class: Insecta
- Order: Coleoptera
- Suborder: Adephaga
- Family: Carabidae
- Genus: Nebria
- Species: N. snowi

Binomial name
- Nebria snowi Bates, 1889

Species of beetle

Nebria snowi is a species of ground beetle from the Nebriinae subfamily that is endemic to Kuril Islands, Russia.
