= Nebria sylvatica =

Scientific classification
- Kingdom: Animalia
- Phylum: Arthropoda
- Class: Insecta
- Order: Coleoptera
- Suborder: Adephaga
- Family: Carabidae
- Genus: Nebria
- Species: N. sylvatica

Binomial name
- Nebria sylvatica Kavanaugh, 1979

Synonyms
- Nebria meanyi sylvatica

Species of beetle

Nebria sylvatica, the sylvan gazelle beetle, is a species of beetle of the Carabidae family. This species is found in British Columbia and Washington, where it lives near springs.

Adults are nocturnal and carnivorous.
