= Nebria tekesensis =

Scientific classification
- Kingdom: Animalia
- Phylum: Arthropoda
- Class: Insecta
- Order: Coleoptera
- Suborder: Adephaga
- Family: Carabidae
- Genus: Nebria
- Species: N. tekesensis

Binomial name
- Nebria tekesensis Ledoux & Roux, 2005

Species of beetle

Nebria tekesensis is a species of beetle of the Carabidae family. This species is found in China (Narat Mountains of Xinjiang).
