= Nebria mathildae =

Scientific classification
- Kingdom: Animalia
- Phylum: Arthropoda
- Clade: Pancrustacea
- Class: Insecta
- Order: Coleoptera
- Suborder: Adephaga
- Family: Carabidae
- Genus: Nebria
- Species: N. mathildae

Binomial name
- Nebria mathildae Ledoux & Roux, 2001

Species of beetle

Nebria mathildae is a species of ground beetle in the Nebriinae subfamily that is endemic to Hebei, province of China.
