= Nebria spatulata =

Scientific classification
- Domain: Eukaryota
- Kingdom: Animalia
- Phylum: Arthropoda
- Class: Insecta
- Order: Coleoptera
- Suborder: Adephaga
- Family: Carabidae
- Genus: Nebria
- Species: N. spatulata

Binomial name
- Nebria spatulata Van Dyke, 1925

Synonyms
- Nebria fusiformis Van Dyke, 1926

Species of beetle

Nebria spatulata is a species of brownish-black coloured ground beetle in the Nebriinae subfamily that is endemic to the US state of California.

== Subspecies ==
- Nebria spatulata sierrae Kavanaugh, 1979 (California) - sierran gazelle beetle
- Nebria spatulata spatulata (California) - spatulate gazelle beetle
