= Nebria sochondensis =

Scientific classification
- Kingdom: Animalia
- Phylum: Arthropoda
- Class: Insecta
- Order: Coleoptera
- Suborder: Adephaga
- Family: Carabidae
- Genus: Nebria
- Species: N. sochondensis

Binomial name
- Nebria sochondensis Shilenkov, 1999

Species of beetle

Nebria sochondensis is a species of beetle of the Carabidae family. This species is found in the Baikal region of Russia and Mongolia.
