= Nebria kabakovi =

Scientific classification
- Domain: Eukaryota
- Kingdom: Animalia
- Phylum: Arthropoda
- Class: Insecta
- Order: Coleoptera
- Suborder: Adephaga
- Family: Carabidae
- Genus: Nebria
- Species: N. kabakovi

Binomial name
- Nebria kabakovi Shilenkov, 1982

Species of beetle

Nebria kabakovi is a species of ground beetle in the Nebriinae subfamily that is endemic to Afghanistan.
