= Nebria leonensis =

Scientific classification
- Kingdom: Animalia
- Phylum: Arthropoda
- Class: Insecta
- Order: Coleoptera
- Suborder: Adephaga
- Family: Carabidae
- Genus: Nebria
- Species: N. leonensis

Binomial name
- Nebria leonensis Assmann, Wrase & Zaballos, 2000

Species of beetle

Nebria leonensis is a species of ground beetle in the Nebriinae subfamily that is endemic to Spain.
