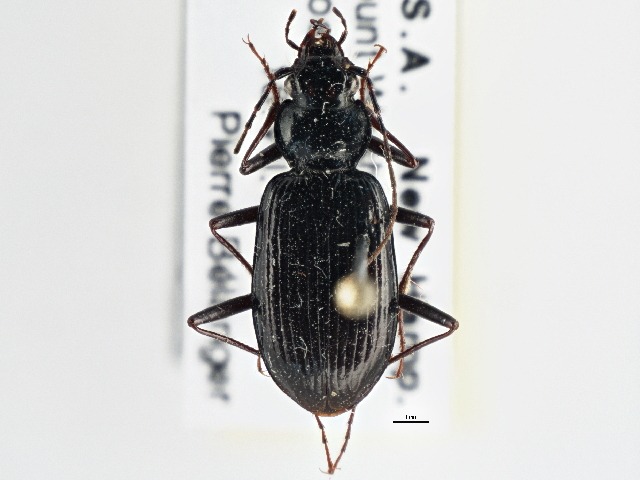

Scientific classification
- Kingdom: Animalia
- Phylum: Arthropoda
- Class: Insecta
- Order: Coleoptera
- Suborder: Adephaga
- Family: Carabidae
- Genus: Nebria
- Species: N. suturalis

Binomial name
- Nebria suturalis LeConte, 1850

Synonyms
- Nebria nimbosa Casey, 1920; Nebria longula LeConte, 1878

= Nebria suturalis =

Species of beetle

Nebria suturalis, the seamed gazelle beetle, is a species of beetle of the Carabidae family. This species is found in Alberta, Labrador, Ontario, Quebec, Colorado, New Hampshire, New York, Vermont and Wyoming, where it is only found on mountain tops.

Adults are wing-dimorphic (with neither form being capable of flight), nocturnal and carnivorous.
