= Nebria orientalis =

Scientific classification
- Kingdom: Animalia
- Phylum: Arthropoda
- Class: Insecta
- Order: Coleoptera
- Suborder: Adephaga
- Family: Carabidae
- Genus: Nebria
- Species: N. orientalis

Binomial name
- Nebria orientalis Banninger, 1949

Species of beetle

Nebria orientalis is a species of ground beetle in the Nebriinae subfamily that is endemic to Guangdong province of China.
