= Nebria turcica =

Scientific classification
- Kingdom: Animalia
- Phylum: Arthropoda
- Class: Insecta
- Order: Coleoptera
- Suborder: Adephaga
- Family: Carabidae
- Genus: Nebria
- Species: N. turcica

Binomial name
- Nebria turcica Chaudoir, 1843

Species of beetle

Nebria turcica is a species of ground beetle in the Nebriinae subfamily that is endemic to Turkey.

== Subspecies ==
The species have 3 subspecies all of which are endemic to Turkey:

- Nebria turcica lassalei Leoux et Roux, 1990
- Nebria turcica turcica Chaudoir, 1843
- Nebria turcica wiedemanni Fischer von Waldheim, 1844
