= Nebria subaerea =

Scientific classification
- Kingdom: Animalia
- Phylum: Arthropoda
- Class: Insecta
- Order: Coleoptera
- Suborder: Adephaga
- Family: Carabidae
- Genus: Nebria
- Species: N. subaerea

Binomial name
- Nebria subaerea Breit, 1914

Synonyms
- Nebria crassiforma Ledoux & Roux, 1989

Species of beetle

Nebria subaerea is a species of beetle of the Carabidae family. This species is found in Kazakhstan, Kyrgyzstan and China.

== Subspecies ==
- Nebria subaerea subaerea (Kazakhstan, Kyrgyzstan)
- Nebria subaerea nigra Bänninger, 1921 (China)
