= Nebria patruelis =

Scientific classification
- Domain: Eukaryota
- Kingdom: Animalia
- Phylum: Arthropoda
- Class: Insecta
- Order: Coleoptera
- Suborder: Adephaga
- Family: Carabidae
- Genus: Nebria
- Species: N. patruelis

Binomial name
- Nebria patruelis Chaudoir, 1846

Species of beetle

Nebria patruelis is a species of ground beetle in the Nebriinae subfamily that is endemic to Georgia.
