= Nebria semenoviana =

Scientific classification
- Kingdom: Animalia
- Phylum: Arthropoda
- Class: Insecta
- Order: Coleoptera
- Suborder: Adephaga
- Family: Carabidae
- Genus: Nebria
- Species: N. semenoviana

Binomial name
- Nebria semenoviana Shilenkov, 1976

Species of beetle

Nebria semenoviana is a species of beetle of the Carabidae family. This species is found in China (Tian Shan).
