= Nebria daisetsuzana =

Scientific classification
- Domain: Eukaryota
- Kingdom: Animalia
- Phylum: Arthropoda
- Class: Insecta
- Order: Coleoptera
- Suborder: Adephaga
- Family: Carabidae
- Genus: Nebria
- Species: N. daisetsuzana

Binomial name
- Nebria daisetsuzana Ueno, 1952

Species of beetle

Nebria daisetsuzana is a species of ground beetle in the Nebriinae subfamily that is endemic to Japan.
