= Nebria femoralis =

Scientific classification
- Kingdom: Animalia
- Phylum: Arthropoda
- Class: Insecta
- Order: Coleoptera
- Suborder: Adephaga
- Family: Carabidae
- Subfamily: Nebriinae
- Tribe: Nebriini
- Genus: Nebria
- Species: N. femoralis

Binomial name
- Nebria femoralis Chaudoir, 1843

Species of beetle

Nebria femoralis is a species in the beetle family Carabidae. It is found in Northwest Russia and Romania.

== Subspecies ==
These two subspecies belong to the species Nebria femoralis:

- Nebria femoralis femoralis Chaudoir, 1843 (Romania)
- Nebria femoralis ormayi Ganglbauer, 1891 (Romania)
