= Nebria chelmosensis =

Scientific classification
- Domain: Eukaryota
- Kingdom: Animalia
- Phylum: Arthropoda
- Class: Insecta
- Order: Coleoptera
- Suborder: Adephaga
- Family: Carabidae
- Genus: Nebria
- Species: N. chelmosensis

Binomial name
- Nebria chelmosensis Maran, 1944

Synonyms
- Nebria taygetana Rottenberg,1874

Species of beetle

Nebria chelmosensis is a species of ground beetle from Nebriinae subfamily that is endemic to Greece.
