= Nebria agilis =

Scientific classification
- Kingdom: Animalia
- Phylum: Arthropoda
- Clade: Pancrustacea
- Class: Insecta
- Order: Coleoptera
- Suborder: Adephaga
- Family: Carabidae
- Genus: Nebria
- Species: N. agilis

Binomial name
- Nebria agilis Ledoux & Roux, 1996

Species of beetle

Nebria agilis is a species of ground beetle from Nebriinae subfamily that is endemic to Yunnan, province of China.
