= Nebria labontei =

Scientific classification
- Kingdom: Animalia
- Phylum: Arthropoda
- Class: Insecta
- Order: Coleoptera
- Suborder: Adephaga
- Family: Carabidae
- Genus: Nebria
- Subgenus: Nebria (Catonebria)
- Species: N. labontei

Binomial name
- Nebria labontei Kavanaugh, 1984

Species of beetle

Nebria labontei, Labonte's gazelle beetle, is a species of ground beetle from the genus Nebria and the subfamily Nebriinae that is endemic to the US state of Oregon, where it is found in the mountains.

Adults are nocturnal and carnivorous.
