= Nebria belloti =

Scientific classification
- Kingdom: Animalia
- Phylum: Arthropoda
- Class: Insecta
- Order: Coleoptera
- Suborder: Adephaga
- Family: Carabidae
- Subfamily: Nebriinae
- Tribe: Nebriini
- Genus: Nebria
- Species: N. belloti

Binomial name
- Nebria belloti Franz, 1954

Species of beetle

Nebria belloti is a species of ground beetle in the Nebriinae subfamily that is endemic to Spain.
