= Nebria baicalica =

Scientific classification
- Kingdom: Animalia
- Phylum: Arthropoda
- Class: Insecta
- Order: Coleoptera
- Suborder: Adephaga
- Family: Carabidae
- Genus: Nebria
- Species: N. baicalica

Binomial name
- Nebria baicalica Motschulsky, 1844

Synonyms
- Nebria baicalensis A.Morawitz, 1862

Species of beetle

Nebria baicalica is a species of ground beetle in the Nebriinae subfamily that is endemic to Irkutsk area, Russia, more precisely, Buryat Republic. The species live around gravel banks of Lake Baikal and its shores.
