= Nebria ambigua =

Scientific classification
- Domain: Eukaryota
- Kingdom: Animalia
- Phylum: Arthropoda
- Class: Insecta
- Order: Coleoptera
- Suborder: Adephaga
- Family: Carabidae
- Genus: Nebria
- Species: N. ambigua

Binomial name
- Nebria ambigua Glasunov, 1902

Species of beetle

Nebria ambigua is a species of black coloured ground beetle in the Nebriinae subfamily that is endemic to Tajikistan.
