= Nebria picta =

Scientific classification
- Domain: Eukaryota
- Kingdom: Animalia
- Phylum: Arthropoda
- Class: Insecta
- Order: Coleoptera
- Suborder: Adephaga
- Family: Carabidae
- Genus: Nebria
- Species: N. picta

Binomial name
- Nebria picta Semenov, 1891

Species of beetle

Nebria picta is a species of beetle from family Carabidae that is endemic to Tajikistan.
