= Nebria pektusanica =

Scientific classification
- Domain: Eukaryota
- Kingdom: Animalia
- Phylum: Arthropoda
- Class: Insecta
- Order: Coleoptera
- Suborder: Adephaga
- Family: Carabidae
- Genus: Nebria
- Species: N. pektusanica

Binomial name
- Nebria pektusanica Horvatovich, 1973

Species of beetle

Nebria pektusanica is a species of ground beetle in the Nebriinae subfamily that can be found in Jilin province of China, at the elevation of 1,900–2,000 metres (6,200–6,600 ft). It can also be found in North Korea.
