= Nebria roborowskii =

Scientific classification
- Kingdom: Animalia
- Phylum: Arthropoda
- Class: Insecta
- Order: Coleoptera
- Suborder: Adephaga
- Family: Carabidae
- Genus: Nebria
- Species: N. roborowskii

Binomial name
- Nebria roborowskii Semenov, 1889

Species of beetle

Nebria roborowskii is a species of ground beetle in the Nebriinae subfamily that is endemic to China and can be found in such provinces as Gansu, Qinghai and Tibet.
