= Nebria lamarckensis =

Scientific classification
- Kingdom: Animalia
- Phylum: Arthropoda
- Class: Insecta
- Order: Coleoptera
- Suborder: Adephaga
- Family: Carabidae
- Genus: Nebria
- Species: N. lamarckensis

Binomial name
- Nebria lamarckensis Kavanaugh, 1979

Synonyms
- Nebria meanyi lamarckensis

Species of beetle

Nebria lamarckensis, or Lamarck's gazelle beetle, is a species of beetle of the Carabidae family. This species is found in California, where it is found near brooks in upland to mountainous areas.

Adults are nocturnal and carnivorous.
