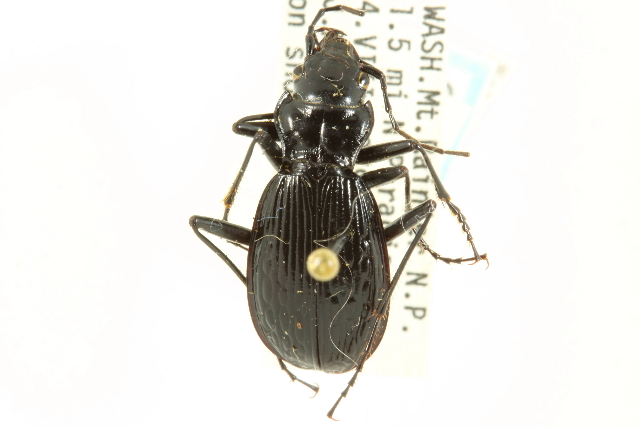
- Nebria vandykei vandykei
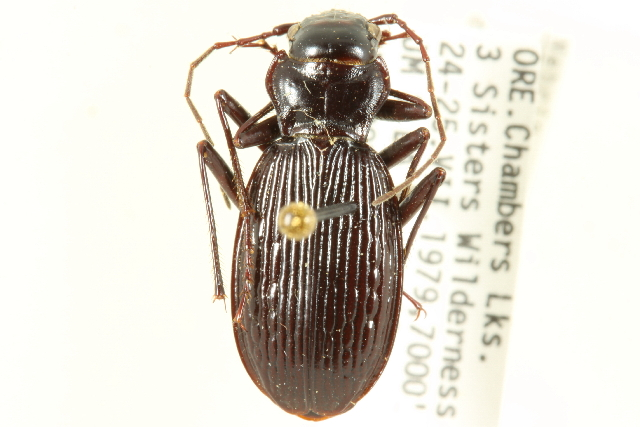
- Nebria vandykei wyeast

Scientific classification
- Domain: Eukaryota
- Kingdom: Animalia
- Phylum: Arthropoda
- Class: Insecta
- Order: Coleoptera
- Suborder: Adephaga
- Family: Carabidae
- Genus: Nebria
- Species: N. vandykei

Binomial name
- Nebria vandykei Bänninger, 1928

= Nebria vandykei =

Species of beetle

Nebria vandykei is a species of beetle of the Carabidae family. This species is found in Washington and Oregon, where it is found along the margins of streams and at edges of snowfields.

Adults are brachypterous, nocturnal and carnivorous.

== Subspecies ==
- Nebria vandykei vandykei (Washington) - Van Dyke's gazelle beetle
- Nebria vandykei wyeast Kavanaugh, 1979 (Oregon) - Wyeast's gazelle beetle
