= Nebria sublivida =

Scientific classification
- Kingdom: Animalia
- Phylum: Arthropoda
- Class: Insecta
- Order: Coleoptera
- Suborder: Adephaga
- Family: Carabidae
- Genus: Nebria
- Species: N. suensoni

Binomial name
- Nebria suensoni Semenov, 1889

Species of beetle

Nebria suensoni is a species of ground beetle from the Nebriinae subfamily that is endemic to Xinjiang province of China.
