= Nebria davatchii =

Scientific classification
- Domain: Eukaryota
- Kingdom: Animalia
- Phylum: Arthropoda
- Class: Insecta
- Order: Coleoptera
- Suborder: Adephaga
- Family: Carabidae
- Genus: Nebria
- Species: N. davatchii

Binomial name
- Nebria davatchii Morvan, 1974

Species of beetle

Nebria davatchii is a species of ground beetle from Nebriinae subfamily that is endemic to Iran.
