= Nebria mingyii =

Scientific classification
- Domain: Eukaryota
- Kingdom: Animalia
- Phylum: Arthropoda
- Class: Insecta
- Order: Coleoptera
- Suborder: Adephaga
- Family: Carabidae
- Genus: Nebria
- Species: N. mingyii

Binomial name
- Nebria mingyii Ledoux & Roux, 2014

Species of beetle

Nebria mingyii is a species of beetle of the Carabidae family. This species is found in China (Qilian Shan of Qinghai Province).
