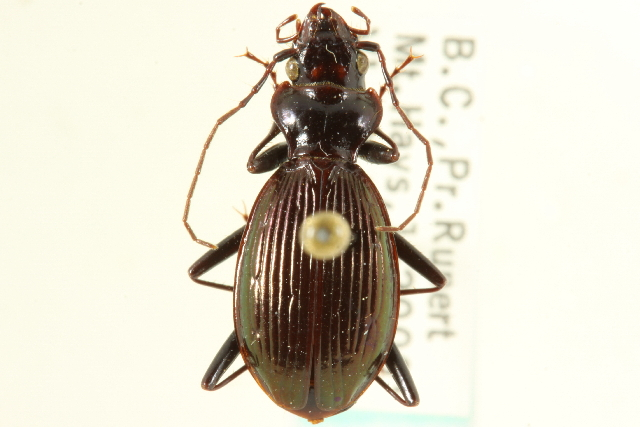
- Nebria kincaidi kincaidi
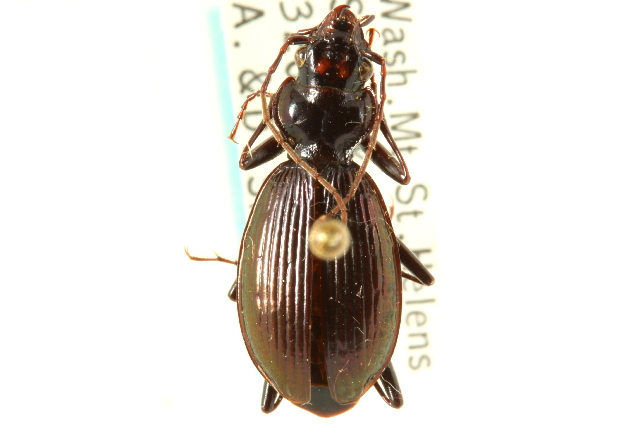
- Nebria kincaidi balli

Scientific classification
- Domain: Eukaryota
- Kingdom: Animalia
- Phylum: Arthropoda
- Class: Insecta
- Order: Coleoptera
- Suborder: Adephaga
- Family: Carabidae
- Genus: Nebria
- Species: N. kincaidi

Binomial name
- Nebria kincaidi Schwarz, 1900

Synonyms
- Nebria columbiana Casey, 1913

= Nebria kincaidi =

Species of beetle

Nebria kincaidi is a species of ground beetle in the family Carabidae. It is found in North America.

Adults are brachypterous, nocturnal and carnivorous.

== Subspecies ==
These two subspecies belong to the species Nebria kincaidi:

- Nebria kincaidi kincaidi (British Columbia, Alaska, Washington) - Kincaid's gazelle beetle
- Nebria kincaidi balli Kavanaugh, 1979 (Oregon, Washington) - Ball's gazelle beetle
