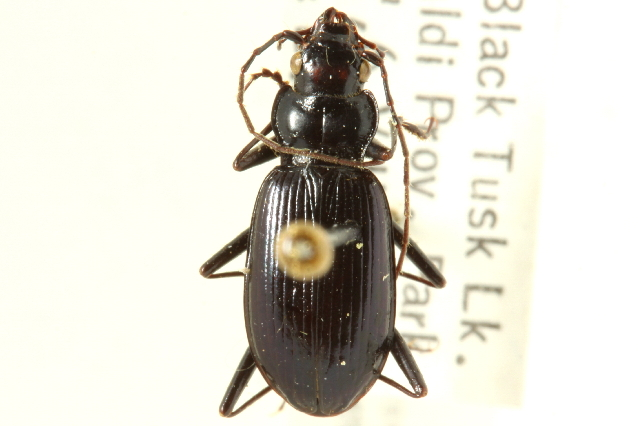

Scientific classification
- Kingdom: Animalia
- Phylum: Arthropoda
- Clade: Pancrustacea
- Class: Insecta
- Order: Coleoptera
- Suborder: Adephaga
- Family: Carabidae
- Genus: Nebria
- Species: N. acuta

Binomial name
- Nebria acuta Lindroth, 1961

= Nebria acuta =

Species of beetle

Nebria acuta is a species of black coloured ground beetle in the subgenus Erwinebria of the genus Nebria in the Nebriinae subfamily that can be found in Canada and United States, in states like Alaska, California, Oregon, and Washington.

== Subspecies ==
- Nebria acuta acuta (USA, Canada, Alaska) - sharp-shouldered gazelle beetle
- Nebria acuta quileute Kavanaugh 1979 (Washington) - Quileute gazelle beetle
- Nebria acuta sonorae Kavanaugh 1981 (California) - Sonora gazelle beetle
