= Nebria nataliae =

Scientific classification
- Domain: Eukaryota
- Kingdom: Animalia
- Phylum: Arthropoda
- Class: Insecta
- Order: Coleoptera
- Suborder: Adephaga
- Family: Carabidae
- Genus: Nebria
- Species: N. nataliae

Binomial name
- Nebria nataliae Kabak & Putchkov, 1996

Species of beetle

Nebria nataliae is a species of ground beetle in the Nebriinae subfamily that is endemic to Kyrgyzstan.
