= Nebria yunnana =

Scientific classification
- Kingdom: Animalia
- Phylum: Arthropoda
- Class: Insecta
- Order: Coleoptera
- Suborder: Adephaga
- Family: Carabidae
- Genus: Nebria
- Species: N. yunnana

Binomial name
- Nebria yunnana Banninger, 1928

Species of beetle

Nebria yunnana is a species of black and orange coloured ground beetle in the Nebriinae subfamily that is endemic to Yunnan, province of China.
