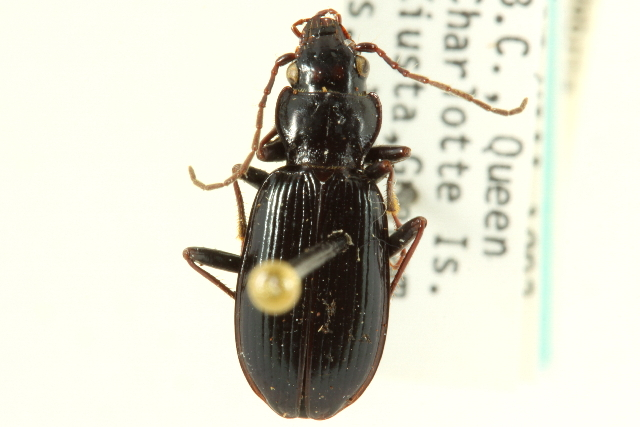

Scientific classification
- Kingdom: Animalia
- Phylum: Arthropoda
- Clade: Pancrustacea
- Class: Insecta
- Order: Coleoptera
- Suborder: Adephaga
- Family: Carabidae
- Genus: Nebria
- Species: N. charlottae

Binomial name
- Nebria charlottae Lindroth, 1961

= Nebria charlottae =

Species of beetle

Nebria charlottae, the Graham Island gazelle beetle, is a species of beetle of the Carabidae family. This species is found only on Graham Island, Haida Gwaii, BC, Canada, where it restricted to upper sea beaches that are partially shaded by the adjacent forest edge.

Adults are brachypterous and nocturnal.
