= Nebria irregularis =

Scientific classification
- Kingdom: Animalia
- Phylum: Arthropoda
- Class: Insecta
- Order: Coleoptera
- Suborder: Adephaga
- Family: Carabidae
- Genus: Nebria
- Species: N. irregularis

Binomial name
- Nebria irregularis Jedlička, 1965

Species of beetle

Nebria irregularis is a species of ground beetle in the Nebriinae subfamily that is endemic to Turkey.
