= Nebria kaszabi =

Scientific classification
- Domain: Eukaryota
- Kingdom: Animalia
- Phylum: Arthropoda
- Class: Insecta
- Order: Coleoptera
- Suborder: Adephaga
- Family: Carabidae
- Genus: Nebria
- Species: N. kaszabi

Binomial name
- Nebria kaszabi Shilenkov, 1982

Species of beetle

Nebria kaszabi is a species of ground beetle in the Nebriinae subfamily that can be found in the south-western Altai of Kazakhstan, Mongolia and Russia.
