= Nebria rougemonti =

Scientific classification
- Kingdom: Animalia
- Phylum: Arthropoda
- Clade: Pancrustacea
- Class: Insecta
- Order: Coleoptera
- Suborder: Adephaga
- Family: Carabidae
- Genus: Nebria
- Species: N. rougemonti

Binomial name
- Nebria rougemonti Ledoux & Roux, 1988

Species of beetle

Nebria rougemonti is a species of ground beetle from a Nebriinae subfamily that is endemic to Sichuan province of China.
