= Nebria suvorovi =

Scientific classification
- Domain: Eukaryota
- Kingdom: Animalia
- Phylum: Arthropoda
- Class: Insecta
- Order: Coleoptera
- Suborder: Adephaga
- Family: Carabidae
- Genus: Nebria
- Species: N. suvorovi

Binomial name
- Nebria suvorovi Shilenkov, 1976

Species of beetle

Nebria suvorovi is a species of ground beetle from Nebriinae subfamily that can be found in Kazakhstan and Kyrgyzstan.
