= Nebria coiffaiti =

Scientific classification
- Kingdom: Animalia
- Phylum: Arthropoda
- Class: Insecta
- Order: Coleoptera
- Suborder: Adephaga
- Family: Carabidae
- Genus: Nebria
- Species: N. coiffaiti

Binomial name
- Nebria coiffaiti Ledoux, 1983

Species of beetle

Nebria coiffaiti is a species of ground beetle from Nebriinae subfamily that is endemic to Turkey.
