= Nebria punctatostriata =

Scientific classification
- Domain: Eukaryota
- Kingdom: Animalia
- Phylum: Arthropoda
- Class: Insecta
- Order: Coleoptera
- Suborder: Adephaga
- Family: Carabidae
- Subfamily: Nebriinae
- Tribe: Nebriini
- Genus: Nebria
- Species: N. punctatostriata

Binomial name
- Nebria punctatostriata L.Schaufuss, 1876

Species of beetle

Nebria punctatostriata is a species of ground beetle in the Nebriinae subfamily that can be found in Portugal and Spain.
