= Nebria macrodera =

Scientific classification
- Kingdom: Animalia
- Phylum: Arthropoda
- Clade: Pancrustacea
- Class: Insecta
- Order: Coleoptera
- Suborder: Adephaga
- Family: Carabidae
- Genus: Nebria
- Species: N. macrodera

Binomial name
- Nebria macrodera K. Daniel, 1903

Species of beetle

Nebria macrodera is a species of ground beetle in the Nebriinae subfamily that is endemic to Italy.
