= Nebria dacatrai =

Scientific classification
- Domain: Eukaryota
- Kingdom: Animalia
- Phylum: Arthropoda
- Class: Insecta
- Order: Coleoptera
- Suborder: Adephaga
- Family: Carabidae
- Subfamily: Nebriinae
- Tribe: Nebriini
- Genus: Nebria
- Species: N. dacatrai

Binomial name
- Nebria dacatrai Ledoux & Roux, 1996

Synonyms
- Nebria decatrai

Species of beetle

Nebria dacatrai is a species in the beetle family Carabidae. It is found in China.

== Subspecies ==
These three subspecies belong to the species Nebria dacatrai:

- Nebria dacatrai contracta Ledoux & Roux, 2006
- Nebria dacatrai dacatrai Ledoux & Roux, 1996
- Nebria dacatrai exigua Ledoux & Roux, 2006
