= Nebria kerzhneri =

Scientific classification
- Kingdom: Animalia
- Phylum: Arthropoda
- Clade: Pancrustacea
- Class: Insecta
- Order: Coleoptera
- Suborder: Adephaga
- Family: Carabidae
- Genus: Nebria
- Species: N. kerzhneri

Binomial name
- Nebria kerzhneri Shilenkov, 1982

Species of beetle

Nebria kerzhneri is a species of ground beetle in the Nebriinae subfamily, endemic to Mongolia.
