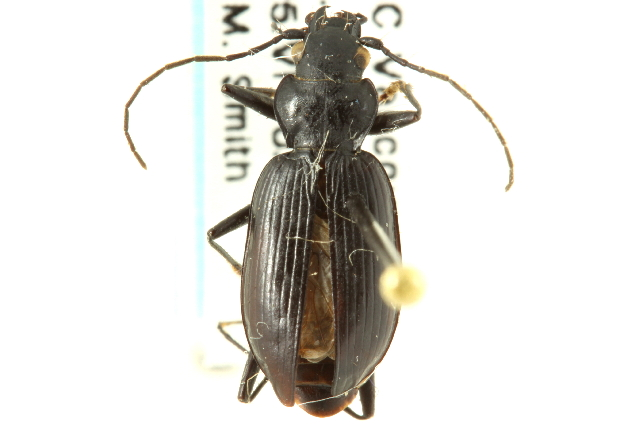

Scientific classification
- Kingdom: Animalia
- Phylum: Arthropoda
- Class: Insecta
- Order: Coleoptera
- Suborder: Adephaga
- Family: Carabidae
- Genus: Nebria
- Species: N. darlingtoni

Binomial name
- Nebria darlingtoni Kavanaugh, 1979

= Nebria darlingtoni =

Species of beetle

Nebria darlingtoni, Darlington's gazelle beetle, is a species of ground beetle from the genus Nebria and the subfamily Nebriinae that is endemic to the US state of California, where it is found in on river banks and near waterfalls on wet ground.

Adults are nocturnal and carnivorous.
