= Nebria giulianii =

Scientific classification
- Kingdom: Animalia
- Phylum: Arthropoda
- Class: Insecta
- Order: Coleoptera
- Suborder: Adephaga
- Family: Carabidae
- Genus: Nebria
- Species: N. giulianii

Binomial name
- Nebria giulianii Kavanaugh, 1981

Synonyms
- Nebria meanyi giulianii

Species of beetle

Nebria giulianii, or Giuliani's gazelle beetle, is a species of beetle of the Carabidae family. This species is found in California and Nevada, where it inhabits montane areas.

Adults are nocturnal and carnivorous.
