= Nebria subdilatata =

Scientific classification
- Kingdom: Animalia
- Phylum: Arthropoda
- Class: Insecta
- Order: Coleoptera
- Suborder: Adephaga
- Family: Carabidae
- Genus: Nebria
- Species: N. subdilatata

Binomial name
- Nebria subdilatata Motschulsky, 1844

Synonyms
- Nebria latiuscula Poppius, 1906; Nebria quinquepunctata Poppius, 1906; Nebria anthracina A.Morawitz, 1862; Nebria ussuriensis A.Morawitz, 1862; Nebria parvicollis Motschulsky, 1859; Nebria microthorax Motschulsky, 1844

Species of beetle

Nebria subdilatata is a species of beetle of the Carabidae family. This species is found in North Korea, Japan, Russia (South Siberian mountains, Middle Siberia, the Amur and Primorye regions, Sakhalin and the Kuriles) and Mongolia.
