= Nebria reichii =

Scientific classification
- Kingdom: Animalia
- Phylum: Arthropoda
- Class: Insecta
- Order: Coleoptera
- Suborder: Adephaga
- Family: Carabidae
- Subfamily: Nebriinae
- Tribe: Nebriini
- Genus: Nebria
- Species: N. reichii

Binomial name
- Nebria reichii Dejean, 1826

Species of beetle

Nebria reichii is a species in the beetle family Carabidae. It is found in Ukraine and Romania.

Adults have a size of 10-12 mm, with shiny black elytra.
