= Nebria heegeri =

Scientific classification
- Kingdom: Animalia
- Phylum: Arthropoda
- Class: Insecta
- Order: Coleoptera
- Suborder: Adephaga
- Family: Carabidae
- Genus: Nebria
- Species: N. heegeri

Binomial name
- Nebria heegeri Dejean 1826

Species of beetle

Nebria heegeri is a species of ground beetle in the Nebriinae subfamily that is found in the Chornagora, and Gorgany Mountains of Ukraine, as well as the Carpathian mountains in Romania. The males are brown coloured, while the females are black. Both sexes are 11 millimetres (0.43 in) long.
