= Nebria pulchrior =

Scientific classification
- Kingdom: Animalia
- Phylum: Arthropoda
- Class: Insecta
- Order: Coleoptera
- Suborder: Adephaga
- Family: Carabidae
- Genus: Nebria
- Species: N. pulchrior

Binomial name
- Nebria pulchrior Maindron, 1906

Species of beetle

Nebria pulchrior is a species of ground beetle from Nebriinae subfamily that is endemic to Yunnan province of China.
