= Nebria formosana =

Scientific classification
- Kingdom: Animalia
- Phylum: Arthropoda
- Clade: Pancrustacea
- Class: Insecta
- Order: Coleoptera
- Suborder: Adephaga
- Family: Carabidae
- Genus: Nebria
- Species: N. formosana

Binomial name
- Nebria formosana Habu, 1972

Species of beetle

Nebria formosana is a species of ground beetle in the Nebriinae subfamily that can be found in China and Taiwan. It was first described by Japanese entomologist Akinobu Habu in 1972.
