= Nebria kumgangi =

Scientific classification
- Kingdom: Animalia
- Phylum: Arthropoda
- Class: Insecta
- Order: Coleoptera
- Suborder: Adephaga
- Family: Carabidae
- Genus: Nebria
- Species: N. kumgangi

Binomial name
- Nebria kumgangi Shilenkov, 1983

Species of beetle

Nebria kumgangi is a species of ground beetle in the Nebriinae family that is endemic to North Korea.
