= Nebria picicornis =

Scientific classification
- Domain: Eukaryota
- Kingdom: Animalia
- Phylum: Arthropoda
- Class: Insecta
- Order: Coleoptera
- Suborder: Adephaga
- Family: Carabidae
- Genus: Nebria
- Species: N. picicornis

Binomial name
- Nebria picicornis Fabricius, 1801

Species of beetle

Nebria picicornis is a species of ground beetle from Nebriinae subfamily that can be found in European countries such as Austria, Belgium, Czech Republic, France, Germany, Italy, Poland, Slovakia, Spain, Switzerland, and Ukraine. It also common in Asia, particularly in countries like Iran and Turkey. The species are black coloured and have orange legs and head.

== Subspecies ==
- Nebria picicornis esfandiari Morvan, 1974
- Nebria picicornis luteipes Chaudoir, 1850
- Nebria picicornis picicornis Fabricius, 1801
- Nebria picicornis radjabii Morvan, 1973
