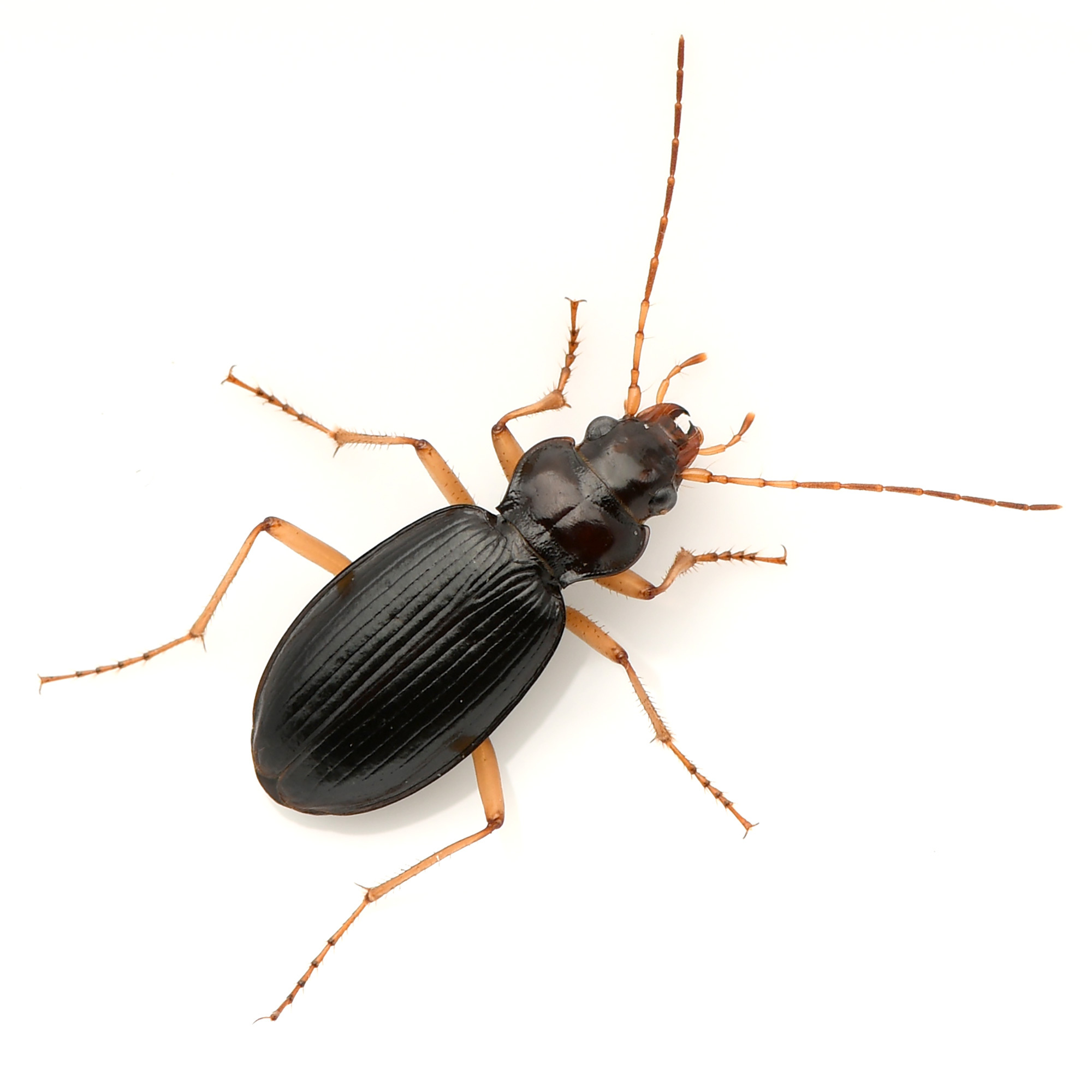
- Nebria eschscholtzii

Scientific classification
- Domain: Eukaryota
- Kingdom: Animalia
- Phylum: Arthropoda
- Class: Insecta
- Order: Coleoptera
- Suborder: Adephaga
- Family: Carabidae
- Genus: Nebria
- Species: N. eschscholtzii

Binomial name
- Nebria eschscholtzii Ménétriés, 1843

Synonyms
- Nebria eschscholtzi; Nebria pallidissima Casey, 1924; Nebria pugetana Casey, 1924; Nebria formalis Casey, 1920; Nebria transversa Casey, 1920; Nebria tenuipes Casey, 1913

= Nebria eschscholtzii =

Species of beetle

Nebria eschscholtzii, Eschscholtz’s gazelle beetle, is a species of ground beetle in the family Carabidae. It is found in North America (California, Idaho, Nevada, Oregon, Washington), where it inhabits low- to upland areas. It is found along the edges of streams.

Adults are nocturnal and carnivorous.
