= Nebria mandibularis =

Scientific classification
- Kingdom: Animalia
- Phylum: Arthropoda
- Class: Insecta
- Order: Coleoptera
- Suborder: Adephaga
- Family: Carabidae
- Subfamily: Nebriinae
- Tribe: Nebriini
- Genus: Nebria
- Species: N. mandibularis

Binomial name
- Nebria mandibularis Bates, 1872

Synonyms
- Nebria mandibalaris

Species of beetle

Nebria mandibularis is a species in the beetle family Carabidae, found in Turkey and Iran.
