= Nebria latior =

Scientific classification
- Kingdom: Animalia
- Phylum: Arthropoda
- Clade: Pancrustacea
- Class: Insecta
- Order: Coleoptera
- Suborder: Adephaga
- Family: Carabidae
- Genus: Nebria
- Subgenus: Boreonebria
- Species: N. latior

Binomial name
- Nebria latior Ledoux & Roux, 1992

Species of beetle

Nebria latior is a species of ground beetle in the Nebriinae subfamily that is endemic to Kazakhstan.
