= Nebria carpathica =

Scientific classification
- Domain: Eukaryota
- Kingdom: Animalia
- Phylum: Arthropoda
- Class: Insecta
- Order: Coleoptera
- Suborder: Adephaga
- Family: Carabidae
- Genus: Nebria
- Species: N. carpathica

Binomial name
- Nebria carpathica E.A. Bielz, 1850

Species of beetle

Nebria carpathica is a species of ground beetle in the Nebriinae subfamily that is endemic to Romania.
