= Nebria peristerica =

Scientific classification
- Kingdom: Animalia
- Phylum: Arthropoda
- Clade: Pancrustacea
- Class: Insecta
- Order: Coleoptera
- Suborder: Adephaga
- Family: Carabidae
- Genus: Nebria
- Species: N. peristerica

Binomial name
- Nebria peristerica Apfelbeck, 1901

Species of beetle

Nebria peristerica is a species of ground beetle in the Nebriinae family that can be found in Greece and North Macedonia.
