= Nebria cameroni =

Scientific classification
- Domain: Eukaryota
- Kingdom: Animalia
- Phylum: Arthropoda
- Class: Insecta
- Order: Coleoptera
- Suborder: Adephaga
- Family: Carabidae
- Genus: Nebria
- Species: N. cameroni

Binomial name
- Nebria cameroni Andrewes, 1925

Species of beetle

Nebria cameroni is a species of ground beetle from Nebriinae subfamily that can be found in Nepal and Uttar Pradesh province of India.
