= Nebria aborana =

Scientific classification
- Kingdom: Animalia
- Phylum: Arthropoda
- Class: Insecta
- Order: Coleoptera
- Suborder: Adephaga
- Family: Carabidae
- Genus: Nebria
- Species: N. aborana

Binomial name
- Nebria aborana Andrewes, 1925

Species of ground beetle

Nebria aborana is a species of ground beetle from Nebriinae subfamily that is endemic to Yunnan province of China.
