= Nebria aetolica =

Scientific classification
- Domain: Eukaryota
- Kingdom: Animalia
- Phylum: Arthropoda
- Class: Insecta
- Order: Coleoptera
- Suborder: Adephaga
- Family: Carabidae
- Genus: Nebria
- Species: N. aetolica

Binomial name
- Nebria aetolica Apfelbeck, 1904

Synonyms
- Nebria karavaensis Horvatovich, 1974

Species of beetle

Nebria aetolica is a species of ground beetle in the Nebriinae subfamily that can be found in Albania, Greece, and North Macedonia.

== Subspecies ==
The species have 3 subspecies all of which can be found only in Greece:

- Nebria aetolica aetolica Apfelbeck, 1901
- Nebria aetolica peristerica Apfelbeck, 1901
- Nebria aetolica vermionica Maran, 1938
