= Nebria orestias =

Scientific classification
- Domain: Eukaryota
- Kingdom: Animalia
- Phylum: Arthropoda
- Class: Insecta
- Order: Coleoptera
- Suborder: Adephaga
- Family: Carabidae
- Genus: Nebria
- Species: N. orestias

Binomial name
- Nebria orestias Andrewes, 1932

Species of beetle

Nebria orestias is a species of ground beetle in the Nebriinae subfamily that can be found in Tibet, and in the Indian state of Sikkim, and Darjeeling district.
