= Nebria ganglbaueri =

Scientific classification
- Kingdom: Animalia
- Phylum: Arthropoda
- Clade: Pancrustacea
- Class: Insecta
- Order: Coleoptera
- Suborder: Adephaga
- Family: Carabidae
- Genus: Nebria
- Species: N. ganglbaueri

Binomial name
- Nebria ganglbaueri Apfelbeck, 1905
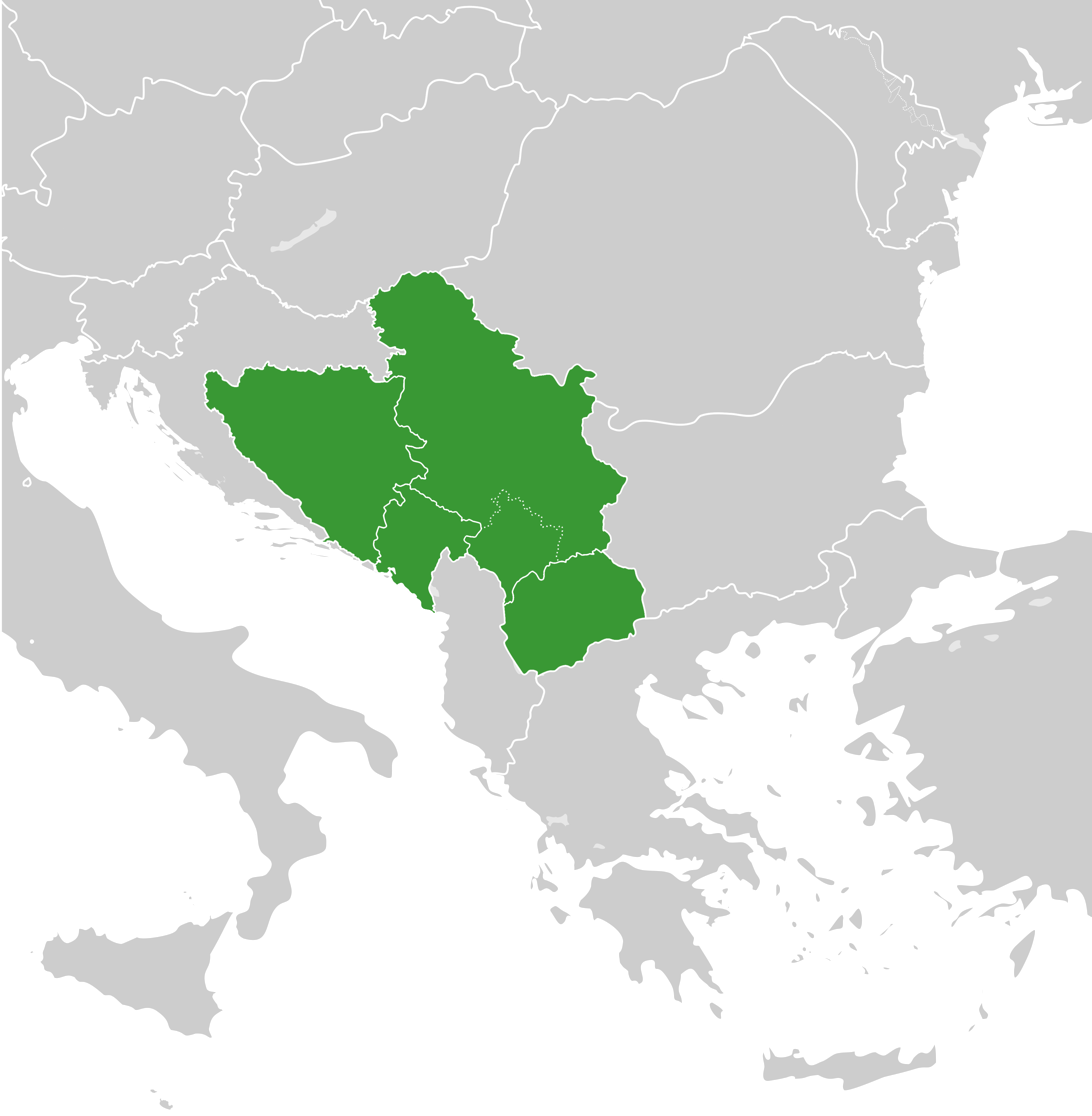
- Distribution of Nebria ganglbaueri

Synonyms
- Nebria gyalicaensis Horvatovich, 1975; Nebria korabensis Horvatovich, 1975; Nebria ljubotensis Horvatovich, 1975

Species of beetle

Nebria ganglbaueri is a species of ground beetle in the Nebriinae subfamily that can be found in Albanian province of Koritnik, and in every state of former Yugoslavia, except for Croatia and Slovenia.

== Subspecies ==
- Nebria ganglbaueri ganglbaueri (former Yugoslavia, Kosovo, North Macedonia, Albania)
- Nebria ganglbaueri matejkai Maran, 1939 (North Macedonia)
