= Nebria rasa =

Scientific classification
- Domain: Eukaryota
- Kingdom: Animalia
- Phylum: Arthropoda
- Class: Insecta
- Order: Coleoptera
- Suborder: Adephaga
- Family: Carabidae
- Genus: Nebria
- Species: N. rasa

Binomial name
- Nebria rasa Andrewes, 1936

Species of beetle

Nebria rasa is a species of ground beetle in the Nebriinae subfamily that is endemic to India, and can be found in such provinces as Sikkim and Darjeeling.
