= Nebria pharina =

Scientific classification
- Domain: Eukaryota
- Kingdom: Animalia
- Phylum: Arthropoda
- Class: Insecta
- Order: Coleoptera
- Suborder: Adephaga
- Family: Carabidae
- Genus: Nebria
- Species: N. pharina

Binomial name
- Nebria pharina Andrewes, 1929

Species of beetle

Nebria pharina is a species of ground beetle in the Nebriinae subfamily that is endemic to Tibet.
