= Nebria elegans =

Scientific classification
- Domain: Eukaryota
- Kingdom: Animalia
- Phylum: Arthropoda
- Class: Insecta
- Order: Coleoptera
- Suborder: Adephaga
- Family: Carabidae
- Genus: Nebria
- Species: N. elegans

Binomial name
- Nebria elegans Andrewes, 1925

Species of beetle

Nebria elegans is a species of ground beetle in the Nebriinae subfamily that is endemic to Uttar Pradesh province of India.
