= Nebria attemsi =

Scientific classification
- Domain: Eukaryota
- Kingdom: Animalia
- Phylum: Arthropoda
- Class: Insecta
- Order: Coleoptera
- Suborder: Adephaga
- Family: Carabidae
- Genus: Nebria
- Species: N. attemsi

Binomial name
- Nebria attemsi Apfelbeck, 1908

Species of beetle

Nebria attemsi is a species of ground beetle in the Nebriinae subfamily that can be found in such countries as Albania, and all states of former Yugoslavia, except for Croatia, Slovenia, and Bosnia and Herzegovina.
