= Nebria tschatkalica =

Scientific classification
- Kingdom: Animalia
- Phylum: Arthropoda
- Class: Insecta
- Order: Coleoptera
- Suborder: Adephaga
- Family: Carabidae
- Genus: Nebria
- Species: N. tschatkalica

Binomial name
- Nebria tschatkalica Kabak & Shilenkov, 2001

Species of beetle

Nebria tschatkalica is a species of ground beetle in the Nebriinae subfamily that is endemic to Kyrgyzstan.
