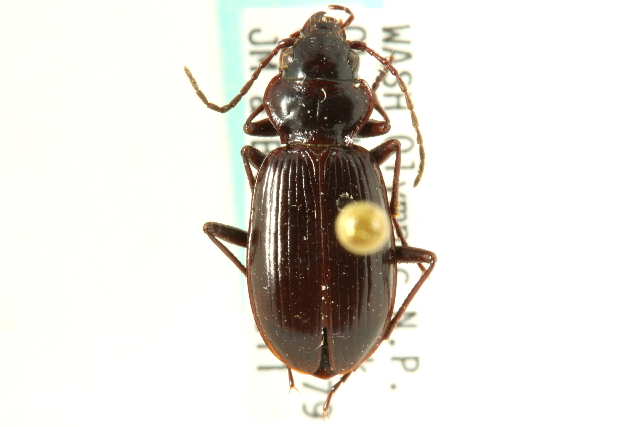
- Nebria crassicornis crassicornis
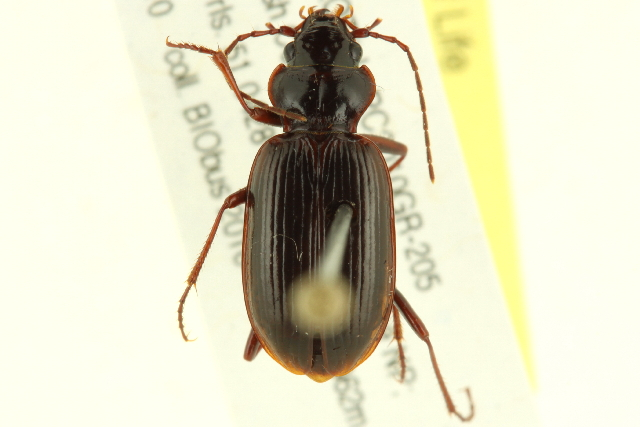
- Nebria crassicornis intermedia

Scientific classification
- Domain: Eukaryota
- Kingdom: Animalia
- Phylum: Arthropoda
- Class: Insecta
- Order: Coleoptera
- Suborder: Adephaga
- Family: Carabidae
- Genus: Nebria
- Species: N. crassicornis

Binomial name
- Nebria crassicornis Van Dyke, 1925

= Nebria crassicornis =

Species of beetle

Nebria crassicornis is a species of ground beetle from Nebriinae subfamily that can be found in such US states as Montana and Washington, where it is found in mid- to upland or even mountainous areas, in the vicinity of water.

Adults are nocturnal and carnivorous.

== Subspecies ==
- Nebria crassicornis crassicornis (British Columbia, Washington) - thick-horned gazelle beetle
- Nebria crassicornis intermedia Van Dyke, 1949 (Alberta, British Columbia, Idaho, Montana, Oregon, Utah, Washington, Wyoming) - intermediate gazelle beetle
