= Nebria velebiticola =

Scientific classification
- Domain: Eukaryota
- Kingdom: Animalia
- Phylum: Arthropoda
- Class: Insecta
- Order: Coleoptera
- Suborder: Adephaga
- Family: Carabidae
- Genus: Nebria
- Subgenus: Nebria (Alpaeonebria)
- Species: N. velebiticola

Binomial name
- Nebria velebiticola Reitter, 1902

Species of beetle

Nebria velebiticola is a species of ground beetle in the Nebriinae subfamily. It is endemic to Croatia.
