= Nebria tenella =

Scientific classification
- Domain: Eukaryota
- Kingdom: Animalia
- Phylum: Arthropoda
- Class: Insecta
- Order: Coleoptera
- Suborder: Adephaga
- Family: Carabidae
- Genus: Nebria
- Subgenus: Nebria
- Species: N. tenella

Binomial name
- Nebria tenella Motschulsky, 1850

Synonyms
- Nebria longicornis Motschulsky, 1850

Species of beetle

Nebria tenella is a species of black coloured ground beetle in the Nebriinae subfamily that can be found in Georgia and Russia.

== Distribution ==
The species inhabit Abishira–Akhuba mountains on the elevation of 2,000–2,650 metres (6,560–8,690 ft), in Karachay-Circassia region of northwest Caucasus. It can also be found in Kyafar-Agur river, of the same region.

== Subspecies ==
The species bears 3 subspecies all of which are endemic to Caucasus:

- Nebria tenella megrelica Shilenkov, 1983
- Nebria tenella saridaghensis Shilenkov, 1983
- Nebria tenella tenella Motschulsky, 1850
