= Nebria nigerrima =

Scientific classification
- Domain: Eukaryota
- Kingdom: Animalia
- Phylum: Arthropoda
- Class: Insecta
- Order: Coleoptera
- Suborder: Adephaga
- Family: Carabidae
- Genus: Nebria
- Species: N. nigerrima

Binomial name
- Nebria nigerrima Chaudoir, 1846

Species of beetle

Nebria nigerrima is a species of ground beetle in the Nebriinae subfamily that can be found in Asian countries such as Armenia, Iran, and Turkey. In Europe, it can only be found in the southern part of Russia. In 2004 it was described in Georgia.

== Subspecies ==
- Nebria nigerrima testadilatata Morvan, 1974
