= Nebria desolata =

Scientific classification
- Kingdom: Animalia
- Phylum: Arthropoda
- Class: Insecta
- Order: Coleoptera
- Suborder: Adephaga
- Family: Carabidae
- Genus: Nebria
- Species: N. desolata

Binomial name
- Nebria desolata Kavanaugh, 1971

Species of beetle

Nebria desolata, the desolate gazelle beetle, is a species of ground beetle from the genus Nebria and the subfamily Nebriinae from US states such as Colorado and Utah, where it is found in upland deserts, at the bases of reddish sandstone cliffs.

Adults are brachypterous, nocturnal and carnivorous.
