= Nebria piute =

Scientific classification
- Domain: Eukaryota
- Kingdom: Animalia
- Phylum: Arthropoda
- Class: Insecta
- Order: Coleoptera
- Suborder: Adephaga
- Family: Carabidae
- Genus: Nebria
- Species: N. piute

Binomial name
- Nebria piute Erwin & Ball, 1972

Species of beetle

Nebria piute is a species of brownish-black coloured ground beetle in the Nebriinae subfamily that is endemic to Utah, United States.

Adults are brachypterous, nocturnal and carnivorous.

== Subspecies ==
- Nebria piute piute (Utah) - Piute gazelle beetle
- Nebria piute sevieri Kavanaugh, 1984 (Utah) - Sevier Plateau gazelle beetle
- Nebria piute utahensis Kavanaugh, 1979 (Utah) - Utah gazelle beetle
