= Nebria fallaciosa fallaciosa =

Scientific classification
- Kingdom: Animalia
- Phylum: Arthropoda
- Class: Insecta
- Order: Coleoptera
- Suborder: Adephaga
- Family: Carabidae
- Genus: Nebria
- Species: N. fallaciosa
- Subspecies: N. f. fallaciosa

Trinomial name
- Nebria fallaciosa fallaciosa Ledoux & Roux, 1992

Subspecies of beetle

Nebria fallaciosa fallaciosa is a subspecies of ground beetle in the Nebriinae subfamily that is endemic to China.
