= Nebria transsylvanica =

Scientific classification
- Domain: Eukaryota
- Kingdom: Animalia
- Phylum: Arthropoda
- Class: Insecta
- Order: Coleoptera
- Suborder: Adephaga
- Family: Carabidae
- Genus: Nebria
- Species: N. transsylvanica

Binomial name
- Nebria transsylvanica Germar, 1824

Synonyms
- Nebria alpigrada Csiki, 1906; Nebria ormayi Ganglbauer, 1891

Species of beetle

Nebria transsylvanica is a species of black coloured ground beetle in the Nebriinae subfamily that can be found in Romania and Carpathia region of Ukraine.

== Description and further distribution ==
The species are common in Carpathia, one of the Ukrainian regions, where they live at a height of 2,000 metres (6,600 ft) in Chornogora Mountains, near Rakhov district. The species are 12 millimetres (0.47 in) long and have a long antennae.
