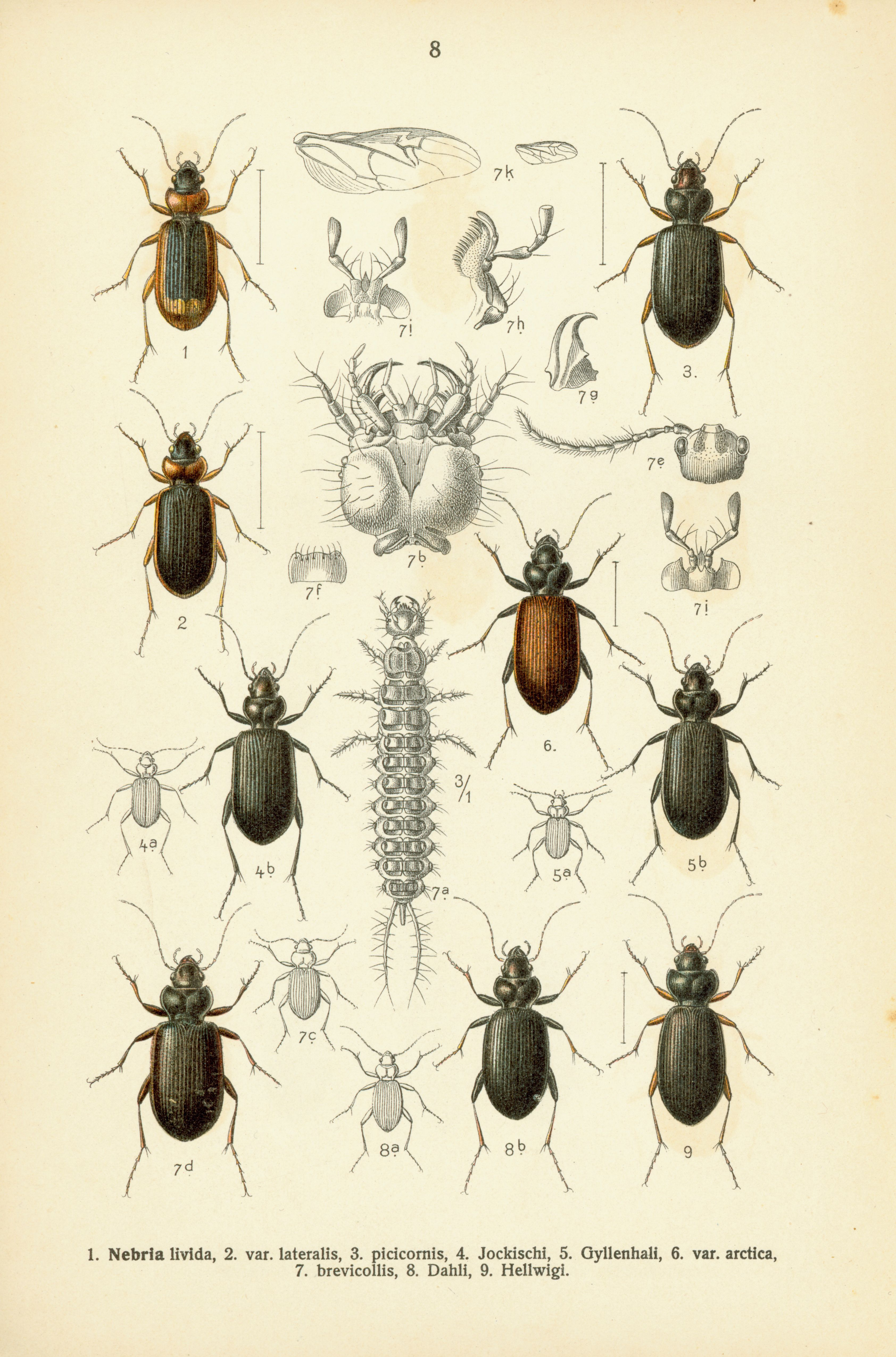
- Illustration item 9. [Nebria] Hellwigi Panz. = Nebria hellwigii (Panzer, 1797), adult, dorsal view

Scientific classification
- Domain: Eukaryota
- Kingdom: Animalia
- Phylum: Arthropoda
- Class: Insecta
- Order: Coleoptera
- Suborder: Adephaga
- Family: Carabidae
- Genus: Nebria
- Species: N. hellwigii

Binomial name
- Nebria hellwigii Panzer, 1803

= Nebria hellwigii =

Species of beetle

Nebria hellwigii is a species of ground beetle in the Nebriinae subfamily that can be found in Austria, Germany, and Italy.

== Subspecies ==
- Nebria hellwigii chalcicola Franz, 1949
- Nebria hellwigii hellwigii Panzer, 1803
