= Nebria banksi =

Scientific classification
- Domain: Eukaryota
- Kingdom: Animalia
- Phylum: Arthropoda
- Class: Insecta
- Order: Coleoptera
- Suborder: Adephaga
- Family: Carabidae
- Genus: Nebria
- Species: N. banksi

Binomial name
- Nebria banksi Crotch, 1871

Synonyms
- Nebria nitidula Fabricius, 1801; Nebria cuprea Sturm, 1826

Species of beetle

Nebria banksi is a metal coloured species of ground beetle in the Nebriinae family that can be found in North Korea and Russia.
