= Nebria angusticollis angusticollis =

Scientific classification
- Domain: Eukaryota
- Kingdom: Animalia
- Phylum: Arthropoda
- Class: Insecta
- Order: Coleoptera
- Suborder: Adephaga
- Family: Carabidae
- Genus: Nebria
- Species: N. angusticollis
- Subspecies: N. a. angusticollis

Trinomial name
- Nebria angusticollis angusticollis Bonelli, 1810

Subspecies of beetle

Nebria angusticollis angusticollis is a subspecies of ground beetle in the Nebriinae subfamily that can be found in the Alps of France, Italy, and Switzerland.
