= Nebria tatrica komareki =

Scientific classification
- Domain: Eukaryota
- Kingdom: Animalia
- Phylum: Arthropoda
- Class: Insecta
- Order: Coleoptera
- Suborder: Adephaga
- Family: Carabidae
- Genus: Nebria
- Species: N. tatrica
- Subspecies: N. t. komareki

Trinomial name
- Nebria tatrica komareki Hurka & Pulpan, 1992

Synonyms
- Alpaeus tatrica komareki

Subspecies of beetle

Nebria tatrica komareki is a subspecies of ground beetle in the Nebriinae subfamily that can be found in Czech Republic and Slovakia.
