= Nebria derkraatzi =

Scientific classification
- Kingdom: Animalia
- Phylum: Arthropoda
- Class: Insecta
- Order: Coleoptera
- Suborder: Adephaga
- Family: Carabidae
- Genus: Nebria
- Species: N. derkraatzi

Binomial name
- Nebria derkraatzi Oberthür, 1883

Species of beetle

Nebria derkraatzi is a species of ground beetle in the Nebriinae subfamily that is endemic to the Chinese capital, Beijing.
