= Nebria cordicollis =

Scientific classification
- Domain: Eukaryota
- Kingdom: Animalia
- Phylum: Arthropoda
- Class: Insecta
- Order: Coleoptera
- Suborder: Adephaga
- Family: Carabidae
- Subfamily: Nebriinae
- Tribe: Nebriini
- Genus: Nebria
- Species: N. cordicollis

Binomial name
- Nebria cordicollis Chaudoir, 1837

Species of beetle

Nebria cordicollis is a species of black coloured ground beetle from Nebriinae subfamily that can be found in Switzerland, Italy, and Germany. The species is about 5 millimetres (0.20 in) long.

== Subspecies ==
These subspecies belong to the species Nebria cordicollis:

- Nebria cordicollis cordicollis Chaudoir, 1837 (Switzerland and Italy)
- Nebria cordicollis crypticola Ledoux & Roux, 2005 (Switzerland)
- Nebria cordicollis escheri Heer, 1837 (Switzerland and Italy)
- Nebria cordicollis gracilis K. & J.Daniel, 1890 (Switzerland)
- Nebria cordicollis heeri K. Daniel, 1903 (Switzerland and Germany)
- Nebria cordicollis kochi Schatzmayr, 1940 (Italy)
- Nebria cordicollis tenuissima Bänninger, 1925 (Switzerland)
- Nebria cordicollis ticinensis Bänninger, 1951 (Switzerland)

Nebria cordicollis praegensis was formerly a valid subspecies, but is now considered a synonym of Nebria cordicollis heeri.
