= Nebria lituyae =

Scientific classification
- Kingdom: Animalia
- Phylum: Arthropoda
- Class: Insecta
- Order: Coleoptera
- Suborder: Adephaga
- Family: Carabidae
- Genus: Nebria
- Species: N. lituyae

Binomial name
- Nebria lituyae Kavanaugh, 1979

Species of beetle

Nebria lituyae, Lituya's gazelle beetle, is a species of ground beetle in the genus Nebria and the subfamily Nebriinae that is endemic to the US state of Alaska and the Canadian province of British Columbia. It is found in the alpine zone on hill summits on moist ground.

Adults are brachypterous, nocturnal and carnivorous.
