= Nebria zioni =

Scientific classification
- Domain: Eukaryota
- Kingdom: Animalia
- Phylum: Arthropoda
- Class: Insecta
- Order: Coleoptera
- Suborder: Adephaga
- Family: Carabidae
- Genus: Nebria
- Species: N. zioni

Binomial name
- Nebria zioni Van Dyke, 1943

Species of beetle

Nebria zioni is a species of brownish-black coloured ground beetle in the Nebriinae subfamily that is endemic to Utah, United States.

Adults are brachypterous, nocturnal and carnivorous.

== Subspecies ==
- Nebria zioni zioni (Utah) - zion gazelle beetle
- Nebria zioni oasis Kavanaugh 1979 (Utah) - oasis gazelle beetle
