= Nebria araschinica =

Scientific classification
- Kingdom: Animalia
- Phylum: Arthropoda
- Class: Insecta
- Order: Coleoptera
- Suborder: Adephaga
- Family: Carabidae
- Genus: Nebria
- Species: N. araschinica

Binomial name
- Nebria araschinica Reitter, 1892: Nebria perlidagensis Shilenkov,1983

Species of beetle

Nebria araschinica is a species of ground beetle in the Nebriinae subfamily that can be found in Armenia and Turkey.
