= Nebria turmaduodecima =

Scientific classification
- Kingdom: Animalia
- Phylum: Arthropoda
- Class: Insecta
- Order: Coleoptera
- Suborder: Adephaga
- Family: Carabidae
- Genus: Nebria
- Species: N. turmaduodecima

Binomial name
- Nebria turmaduodecima Kavanaugh, 1981

Species of beetle

Nebria turmaduodecima, Troop Twelve's gazelle beetle, is a species of black coloured ground beetle from the genus Nebria and the subfamily Nebriinae that is endemic to the US state of California, where it inhabits the margins of snowfields in upland to mountainous areas.

Adults are brachypterous, nocturnal and carnivorous.
