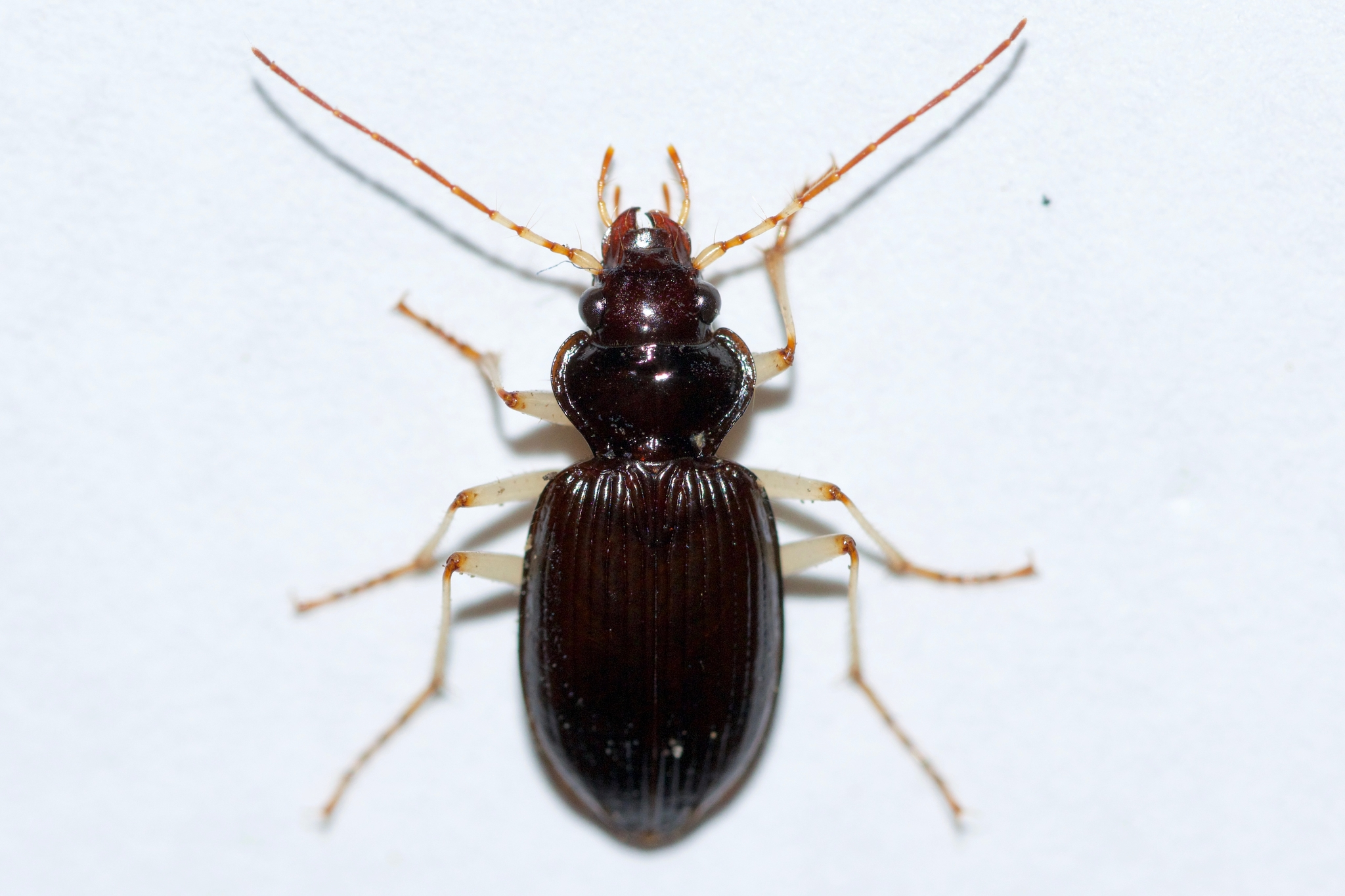

Scientific classification
- Kingdom: Animalia
- Phylum: Arthropoda
- Class: Insecta
- Order: Coleoptera
- Suborder: Adephaga
- Family: Carabidae
- Genus: Nebria
- Species: N. lacustris

Binomial name
- Nebria lacustris Casey, 1913

Synonyms
- Nebria expansa Casey, 1913

= Nebria lacustris =

Species of beetle

Nebria lacustris, also known as the lacustrine gazelle beetle, is a species of ground beetle in the Nebriinae subfamily that can be found in southern Canada and in the US states such as Tennessee and Wisconsin. One of such species was found in Great Smoky Mountains National Park. Approximately 9–12 mm (0.35–0.47 in) long, it is black coloured with orange legs. Adults can move quickly, and are nocturnally active.
