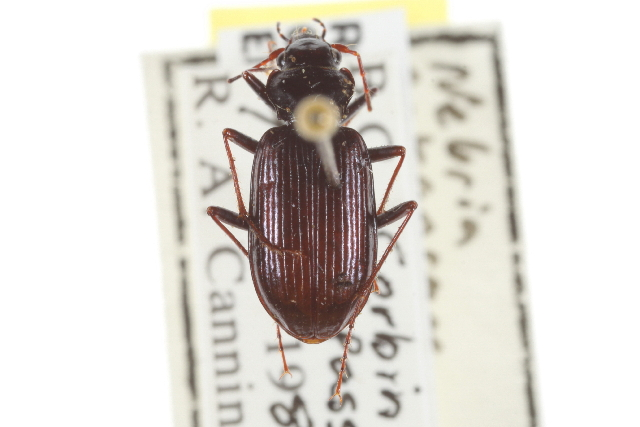

Scientific classification
- Kingdom: Animalia
- Phylum: Arthropoda
- Class: Insecta
- Order: Coleoptera
- Suborder: Adephaga
- Family: Carabidae
- Genus: Nebria
- Species: N. arkansana

Binomial name
- Nebria arkansana Casey, 1913

Synonyms
- Nebria teewinot Kavanaugh, 1979; Nebria uinta Kavanaugh, 1979

= Nebria arkansana =

Species of beetle

Nebria arkansana is a species of ground beetle in the Nebriinae subfamily that can be found in Canada and in US states such as Colorado, Montana, Utah, and Wyoming.

== Subspecies ==
- Nebria arkansana arkansana (Colorado, New Mexico, Utah, Wyoming) - Arkansas river gazelle beetle
- Nebria arkansana edwardsi Kavanaugh 1979 (western North America) - Edward’s gazelle beetle
- Nebria arkansana fragilis Casey 1924 (Utah, Wyoming) - fragile gazelle beetle
- Nebria arkansana oowah Kavanaugh 1979 (Utah) - La Sal mountains gazelle beetle
