= Nebria tatrica tatrica =

Scientific classification
- Domain: Eukaryota
- Kingdom: Animalia
- Phylum: Arthropoda
- Class: Insecta
- Order: Coleoptera
- Suborder: Adephaga
- Family: Carabidae
- Genus: Nebria
- Species: N. tatrica
- Subspecies: N. t. tatrica

Trinomial name
- Nebria tatrica tatrica L. Miller, 1859

Synonyms
- Alpaeus tatrica tatrica

Subspecies of beetle

Nebria tatrica tatrica is a subspecies of ground beetle in the Nebriinae subfamily that can be found in Poland, Slovenia, and Slovakia.
