= Nebria tiani =

Scientific classification
- Kingdom: Animalia
- Phylum: Arthropoda
- Clade: Pancrustacea
- Class: Insecta
- Order: Coleoptera
- Suborder: Adephaga
- Family: Carabidae
- Genus: Nebria
- Species: N. tiani

Binomial name
- Nebria tiani Ledoux & Roux, 2003

Species of beetle

Nebria tiani is a species of ground beetle in the Nebriinae subfamily that is endemic to Guangxi, province of China.
