= Nebria cordicollis kochi =

Scientific classification
- Kingdom: Animalia
- Phylum: Arthropoda
- Clade: Pancrustacea
- Class: Insecta
- Order: Coleoptera
- Suborder: Adephaga
- Family: Carabidae
- Genus: Nebria
- Species: N. cordicollis
- Subspecies: N. c. kochi

Trinomial name
- Nebria cordicollis kochi Schatzmayr, 1940

Subspecies of beetle

Nebria cordicollis kochi is a subspecies of ground beetle in the Nebriinae subfamily that is endemic to Italy.
