= Nebria rubripes rousseleti =

Scientific classification
- Domain: Eukaryota
- Kingdom: Animalia
- Phylum: Arthropoda
- Class: Insecta
- Order: Coleoptera
- Suborder: Adephaga
- Family: Carabidae
- Genus: Nebria
- Species: N. rubripes
- Subspecies: N. r. rousseleti

Trinomial name
- Nebria rubripes rousseleti Ledoux & Roux, 1988

Synonyms
- Nebria rubripes atripes Pic, 1891; Nebria rubripes intermediiformis Pic, 1911

Subspecies of beetle

Nebria rubripes rousseleti is a subspecies of ground beetle in the Nebriinae subfamily that is endemic to France.
