= Nebria catenata =

Scientific classification
- Kingdom: Animalia
- Phylum: Arthropoda
- Class: Insecta
- Order: Coleoptera
- Suborder: Adephaga
- Family: Carabidae
- Genus: Nebria
- Species: N. catenata

Binomial name
- Nebria catenata Casey, 1913

Species of beetle

Nebria catenata, the southern chain-backed gazelle beetle, is a species of ground beetle from Nebriinae subfamily that is endemic to the US states of Colorado and Utah, where it is found from the uplands to the mountains along the margins of rivers and cool springs.

Adults are brachypterous, nocturnal and carnivorous.
