= Nebria tenella tenella =

Scientific classification
- Domain: Eukaryota
- Kingdom: Animalia
- Phylum: Arthropoda
- Class: Insecta
- Order: Coleoptera
- Suborder: Adephaga
- Family: Carabidae
- Genus: Nebria
- Species: N. tenella
- Subspecies: N. t. tenella

Trinomial name
- Nebria tenella tenella Motschulsky, 1850

Subspecies of beetle

Nebria tenella tenella is a subspecies of black coloured ground beetle in the Nebriinae subfamily that can be found in Georgia and Russia.

== Distribution ==
The species inhabit the Abishira–Akhuba mountains on the elevation of 2,000–2,650 metres (6,560–8,690 ft), in the Karachay-Circassia region of northwest Caucasus. It can also be found in the Kyafar-Agur river, of the same region.
