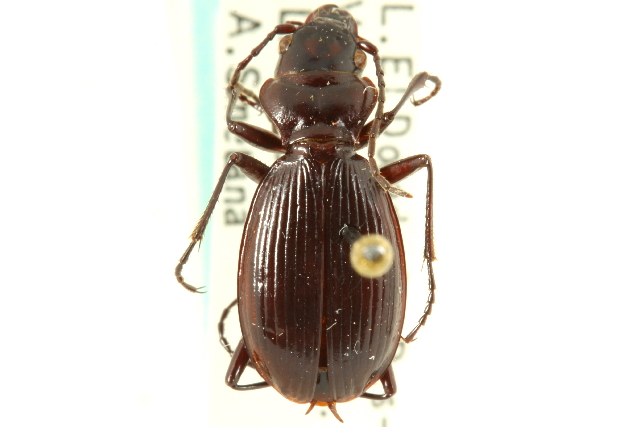

Scientific classification
- Domain: Eukaryota
- Kingdom: Animalia
- Phylum: Arthropoda
- Class: Insecta
- Order: Coleoptera
- Suborder: Adephaga
- Family: Carabidae
- Genus: Nebria
- Species: N. ovipennis

Binomial name
- Nebria ovipennis LeConte, 1878

= Nebria ovipennis =

Species of beetle

Nebria ovipennis, the oval gazelle beetle, is a species of ground beetle in the Nebriinae subfamily that is endemic to the US states of California and Nevada, where it inhabits meadows and areas near snowfields in uplands areas and mountains.

Adults are brachypterous, nocturnal and carnivorous.
