= Nebria laticollis fagniezi =

Scientific classification
- Domain: Eukaryota
- Kingdom: Animalia
- Phylum: Arthropoda
- Class: Insecta
- Order: Coleoptera
- Suborder: Adephaga
- Family: Carabidae
- Genus: Nebria
- Species: N. laticollis
- Subspecies: N. l. fagniezi

Trinomial name
- Nebria laticollis fagniezi Jeannel, 1937

Subspecies of beetle

Nebria laticollis fagniezi is a subspecies of ground beetle in the Nebriinae subfamily that is endemic to France.
