= Nebria laticollis =

Scientific classification
- Kingdom: Animalia
- Phylum: Arthropoda
- Class: Insecta
- Order: Coleoptera
- Suborder: Adephaga
- Family: Carabidae
- Genus: Nebria
- Species: N. laticollis

Binomial name
- Nebria laticollis Dejean, 1826

Synonyms
- Nebria maritima

Species of beetle

Nebria laticollis is a species of ground beetle in the Nebriinae subfamily that can be found in France, Italy, and Switzerland.

== Subspecies ==
The species have 4 subspecies, 3 of which are endemic to France. The rest can be found in Italy and Switzerland, besides French mainland:

- Nebria laticollis allobrogica Jeanne, 1976 France
- Nebria laticollis fagniezi Jeannel, 1937 France
- Nebria laticollis laticollis Dejean, 1826 France, Italy, Switzerland
- Nebria laticollis maritima Jeanne, 1976 France
