= Nebria andarensis =

Scientific classification
- Kingdom: Animalia
- Phylum: Arthropoda
- Class: Insecta
- Order: Coleoptera
- Suborder: Adephaga
- Family: Carabidae
- Genus: Nebria
- Species: N. andarensis

Binomial name
- Nebria andarensis Bolivar & Pieltain 1923

Species of beetle

Nebria andarensis is a species of ground beetle in the Nebriinae subfamily that is endemic to Spain.
