= Nebria tristicula =

Scientific classification
- Kingdom: Animalia
- Phylum: Arthropoda
- Class: Insecta
- Order: Coleoptera
- Suborder: Adephaga
- Family: Carabidae
- Genus: Nebria
- Species: N. tristicula

Binomial name
- Nebria tristicula Reitter, 1888

Species of beetle

Nebria tristicula is a species of black coloured ground beetle in the Nebriinae subfamily that can be found in Georgia and Russia, in Yatyrgvart mountains. The species are 13 millimetres (0.51 in) long.
