= Nebria composita =

Scientific classification
- Kingdom: Animalia
- Phylum: Arthropoda
- Clade: Pancrustacea
- Class: Insecta
- Order: Coleoptera
- Suborder: Adephaga
- Family: Carabidae
- Genus: Nebria
- Species: N. composita

Binomial name
- Nebria composita Ledoux & Roux, 1993

Species of beetle

Nebria composita is a species of ground beetle in the Nebriinae subfamily that can be found in Qinghai and Tibet provinces of China.

== Subspecies ==
The species have 2 subspecies, 1 is found in Qinghai, while the other is endemic to Tibet:

- Nebria composita composita Ledoux & Roux, 1993
- Nebria composita macra Ledoux & Roux, 2005
