= Nebria navajo =

Scientific classification
- Domain: Eukaryota
- Kingdom: Animalia
- Phylum: Arthropoda
- Class: Insecta
- Order: Coleoptera
- Suborder: Adephaga
- Family: Carabidae
- Genus: Nebria
- Species: N. navajo

Binomial name
- Nebria navajo Kavanaugh, 1979

Species of beetle

Nebria navajo, the Navajo gazelle beetle, is a species of ground beetle in the Nebriinae subfamily that can be found in such US states as Arizona, where it inhabits Canyonlands in upland deserts.

Adults are brachypterous, nocturnal and carnivorous.
