= Nebria fallaciosa =

Scientific classification
- Kingdom: Animalia
- Phylum: Arthropoda
- Clade: Pancrustacea
- Class: Insecta
- Order: Coleoptera
- Suborder: Adephaga
- Family: Carabidae
- Genus: Nebria
- Species: N. fallaciosa

Binomial name
- Nebria fallaciosa Ledoux & Roux, 1992

Species of beetle

Nebria fallaciosa is a species of ground beetle in the Nebriinae subfamily that is endemic to China.

== Subspecies ==
- Nebria fallaciosa fallaciosa Ledoux & Roux, 1992
- Nebria fallaciosa farkaci Ledoux & Roux, 1996
