= Nebria lyelli =

Scientific classification
- Domain: Eukaryota
- Kingdom: Animalia
- Phylum: Arthropoda
- Class: Insecta
- Order: Coleoptera
- Suborder: Adephaga
- Family: Carabidae
- Genus: Nebria
- Species: N. lyelli

Binomial name
- Nebria lyelli Van Dyke, 1925

Species of beetle

Nebria lyelli, the Mount Lyell gazelle beetle, is a species of ground beetle in the Nebriinae subfamily that is endemic to the U.S. state of California. Its habitat consists of the margins of glacial streams in the mountains.

Adults are brachypterous, nocturnal and carnivorous.
