= Nebria carbonaria =

Scientific classification
- Domain: Eukaryota
- Kingdom: Animalia
- Phylum: Arthropoda
- Class: Insecta
- Order: Coleoptera
- Suborder: Adephaga
- Family: Carabidae
- Genus: Nebria
- Species: N. carbonaria

Binomial name
- Nebria carbonaria Eschscholtz, 1829

Synonyms
- Nebria lyrodera Motschulsky, 1860

Species of beetle

Nebria carbonaria is a species of ground beetle in the Nebriinae subfamily that is endemic to Kamchatka, Russia.
