= Nebria sierrablancae =

Scientific classification
- Kingdom: Animalia
- Phylum: Arthropoda
- Class: Insecta
- Order: Coleoptera
- Suborder: Adephaga
- Family: Carabidae
- Genus: Nebria
- Species: N. sierrablancae

Binomial name
- Nebria sierrablancae Kavanaugh, 1984

Species of beetle

Nebria sierrablancae, the Sierra Blanca gazelle beetle, is a species of ground beetle in the genus Nebria and the subfamily Nebriinae that is endemic to the US state of New Mexico, where it found at the edges of shaded streams in the mountains.

Adults are brachypterous, nocturnal and carnivorous.
