= Nebria rubripes olivieri =

Scientific classification
- Kingdom: Animalia
- Phylum: Arthropoda
- Class: Insecta
- Order: Coleoptera
- Suborder: Adephaga
- Family: Carabidae
- Genus: Nebria
- Species: N. rubripes
- Subspecies: N. r. olivieri

Trinomial name
- Nebria rubripes olivieri Dejean, 1826

Synonyms
- Nebria rubripes atripes Pic, 1891; Nebria rubripes intermediiformis Pic, 1911

Subspecies of beetle

Nebria rubripes olivieri is a subspecies of ground beetle in the Nebriinae subfamily that can be found in France and Spain.
