= Nebria lyubechanskii =

Scientific classification
- Domain: Eukaryota
- Kingdom: Animalia
- Phylum: Arthropoda
- Class: Insecta
- Order: Coleoptera
- Suborder: Adephaga
- Family: Carabidae
- Genus: Nebria
- Species: N. lyubechanskii

Binomial name
- Nebria lyubechanskii Dudko, 2008

Species of beetle

Nebria lyubechanskii is a species of ground beetle in the Nebriinae subfamily that can be found in southwest Tuva and Tsagan-Shibetu regions of Russia.
