= Nebria angustula =

Scientific classification
- Kingdom: Animalia
- Phylum: Arthropoda
- Class: Insecta
- Order: Coleoptera
- Suborder: Adephaga
- Family: Carabidae
- Genus: Nebria
- Subgenus: Nebria (Reductonebria)
- Species: N. angustula

Binomial name
- Nebria angustula Motschulsky, 1866

Species of beetle

Nebria angustula is a species of ground beetle in the Nebriinae subfamily that can be found in Kamchatka, Russia.
