= Nebria trifaria =

Scientific classification
- Domain: Eukaryota
- Kingdom: Animalia
- Phylum: Arthropoda
- Class: Insecta
- Order: Coleoptera
- Suborder: Adephaga
- Family: Carabidae
- Genus: Nebria
- Species: N. trifaria

Binomial name
- Nebria trifaria LeConte, 1878

Species of beetle

Nebria trifaria is a species of brown coloured ground beetle in the Nebriinae subfamily that can be found in such US states as Montana, Utah, and Wyoming.

Adults are brachypterous, nocturnal and carnivorous.

== Subspecies ==
- Nebria trifaria trifaria (Idaho, Montana, Nevada, Utah, Wyoming) - northern chain-backed gazelle beetle
- Nebria trifaria pasquineli Kavanaugh, 1984 (Colorado, Wyoming) - Pasquinel's gazelle beetle
