= Nebria angusticollis =

Scientific classification
- Domain: Eukaryota
- Kingdom: Animalia
- Phylum: Arthropoda
- Class: Insecta
- Order: Coleoptera
- Suborder: Adephaga
- Family: Carabidae
- Genus: Nebria
- Species: N. angusticollis

Binomial name
- Nebria angusticollis Bonelli, 1810

Species of beetle

Nebria angusticollis is a species of ground beetle in Nebriinae subfamily that can be found in the Alps of France, Italy, and Switzerland.

== Subspecies ==
The species bears 2 subspecies all of which could be found in the Alps of France, Italy, and Switzerland:

- Nebria angusticollis angusticollis Bonelli, 1810
- Nebria angusticollis microcephala K. Daniel & D. Daniel, 1891
