= Nebria sajana =

Scientific classification
- Domain: Eukaryota
- Kingdom: Animalia
- Phylum: Arthropoda
- Class: Insecta
- Order: Coleoptera
- Suborder: Adephaga
- Family: Carabidae
- Genus: Nebria
- Species: N. sajana

Binomial name
- Nebria sajana Dudko & Shilenkov, 2001

Species of beetle

Nebria sajana is a species of ground beetle in the Nebriinae subfamily that can be found in Altai and Western Sayans. The name comes from the Sayan region where it lives.
