= Nebria tatrica dumbirensis =

Scientific classification
- Domain: Eukaryota
- Kingdom: Animalia
- Phylum: Arthropoda
- Class: Insecta
- Order: Coleoptera
- Suborder: Adephaga
- Family: Carabidae
- Genus: Nebria
- Species: N. tatrica
- Subspecies: N. t. dumbirensis

Trinomial name
- Nebria tatrica dumbirensis Hurka & Pulpan, 1957

Synonyms
- Alpaeus tatrica dumbirensis

Subspecies of beetle

Nebria tatrica dumbirensis is a subspecies of ground beetle in the Nebriinae subfamily that is endemic to the mountain range of Nízké Tatry in Slovakia, and Czech Republic.
