= Nebria andalusia =

Scientific classification
- Domain: Eukaryota
- Kingdom: Animalia
- Phylum: Arthropoda
- Class: Insecta
- Order: Coleoptera
- Suborder: Adephaga
- Family: Carabidae
- Genus: Nebria
- Species: N. andalusia

Binomial name
- Nebria andalusia Rambur, 1837

Synonyms
- Nebria variabilis Lucas, 1842

Species of beetle

Nebria andalusia is a species of ground beetle in the Nebriinae subfamily. In Europe, it can be found in such countries as Italy, Portugal, Spain, and on islands such as Malta and Sicily. It is also present in North Africa, in countries such as Algeria, Morocco, and Tunisia.
