= Nebria picea =

Scientific classification
- Kingdom: Animalia
- Phylum: Arthropoda
- Class: Insecta
- Order: Coleoptera
- Suborder: Adephaga
- Family: Carabidae
- Genus: Nebria
- Species: N. picea

Binomial name
- Nebria picea Dejean, 1826

Synonyms
- Oreonebria picea (Dejean, 1826)

Species of beetle

Nebria picea is a species of ground beetle in the Nebriinae subfamily that can be found in Austria, France, Italy, and Switzerland.
