= Nebria nigerrima testadilatata =

Scientific classification
- Domain: Eukaryota
- Kingdom: Animalia
- Phylum: Arthropoda
- Class: Insecta
- Order: Coleoptera
- Suborder: Adephaga
- Family: Carabidae
- Genus: Nebria
- Species: N. nigerrima
- Subspecies: N. n. testadilatata

Trinomial name
- Nebria nigerrima testadilatata Morvan, 1974

Subspecies of beetle

Nebria nigerrima testadilatata is a species of ground beetle in the Nebriinae subfamily that can be found in Asian countries such as Azerbaijan and Iran.
