= Nebria cordicollis ticinensis =

Scientific classification
- Domain: Eukaryota
- Kingdom: Animalia
- Phylum: Arthropoda
- Class: Insecta
- Order: Coleoptera
- Suborder: Adephaga
- Family: Carabidae
- Genus: Nebria
- Species: N. cordicollis
- Subspecies: N. c. ticinensis

Trinomial name
- Nebria cordicollis ticinensis Banninger, 1951

Subspecies of beetle

Nebria cordicollis ticinensis is a subspecies of ground beetle in the Nebriinae subfamily that is endemic to Switzerland.
