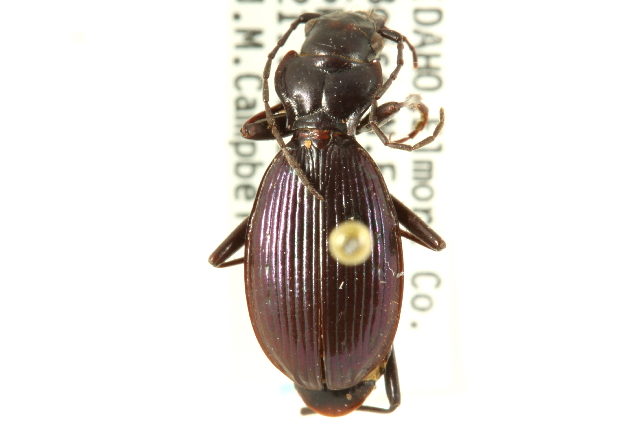

Scientific classification
- Domain: Eukaryota
- Kingdom: Animalia
- Phylum: Arthropoda
- Class: Insecta
- Order: Coleoptera
- Suborder: Adephaga
- Family: Carabidae
- Genus: Nebria
- Species: N. carri

Binomial name
- Nebria carri Kavanaugh, 1979

= Nebria carri =

Species of beetle

Nebria carri, Carr's gazelle beetle, is a species of ground beetle from the Nebriinae subfamily that is endemic to the US states of Idaho and Montana, where it inhabits upland to mountainous areas.

Adults may be found at the margins of cool springs on wet ground. They are brachypterous, nocturnal and carnivorous.
