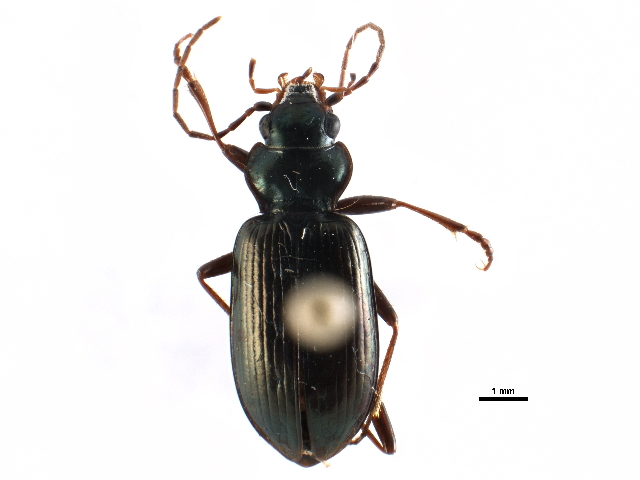

Scientific classification
- Domain: Eukaryota
- Kingdom: Animalia
- Phylum: Arthropoda
- Class: Insecta
- Order: Coleoptera
- Suborder: Adephaga
- Family: Carabidae
- Genus: Nebria
- Species: N. frigida

Binomial name
- Nebria frigida R.F. Sahlberg, 1844

Synonyms
- Nebria reducta Casey, 1920; Nebria parvula J.Sahlberg, 1885; Nebria viridis G.Horn, 1870

= Nebria frigida =

Species of beetle

Nebria frigida, the frigid gazelle beetle, is a species of ground beetle in the Nebriinae subfamily that is native to the Palearctic realm and Russia. There, it is found in cities such as Altai, Chita, Kamchatka, Khabarovsk, the Ural Mountains, Krasnoyarsk, Magadan, north of western Siberia, and into Yakutiya. It is also common in the US state of Alaska.

Adults are nocturnal and carnivorous.
