= Nebria xanthacra =

Scientific classification
- Domain: Eukaryota
- Kingdom: Animalia
- Phylum: Arthropoda
- Class: Insecta
- Order: Coleoptera
- Suborder: Adephaga
- Family: Carabidae
- Genus: Nebria
- Species: N. xanthacra

Binomial name
- Nebria xanthacra Chaudoir, 1850

Species of beetle

Nebria xanthacra is a species of ground beetle in the Nebriinae subfamily that can be found in Iran, Turkmenistan, and Himachal Pradesh province of India.
