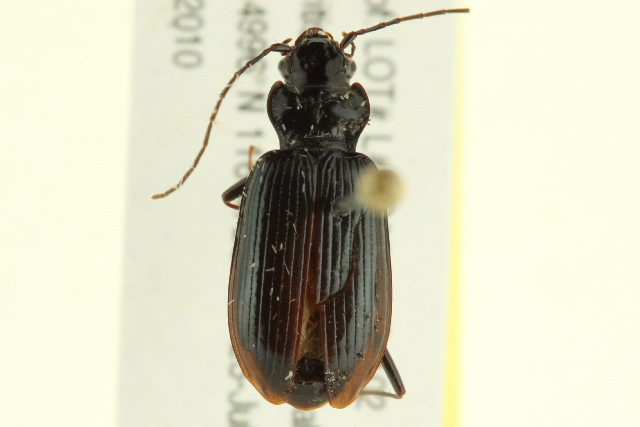
- Nebria sahlbergii sahlbergii
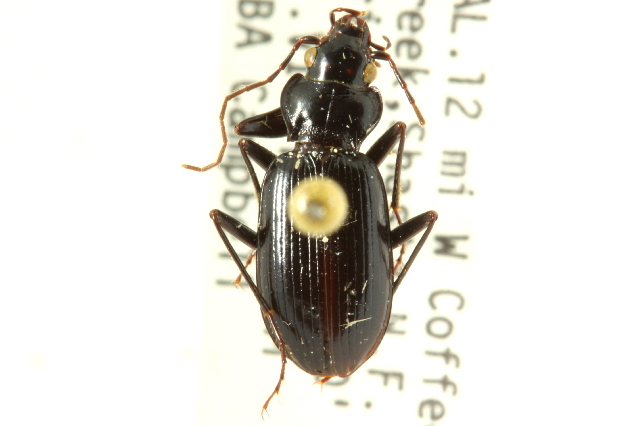
- Nebria sahlbergii triad

Scientific classification
- Domain: Eukaryota
- Kingdom: Animalia
- Phylum: Arthropoda
- Class: Insecta
- Order: Coleoptera
- Suborder: Adephaga
- Family: Carabidae
- Subfamily: Nebriinae
- Tribe: Nebriini
- Genus: Nebria
- Species: N. sahlbergii

Binomial name
- Nebria sahlbergii Fischer von Waldheim, 1828

Synonyms
- Nebria sahlbergi; Nebria violacea Motschulsky, 1850; Nebria aleuta Van Dyke, 1924

= Nebria sahlbergii =

Species of beetle

Nebria sahlbergii is a species in the beetle family Carabidae. It is found in the can be found in Aleutian Islands, Canada, and in the southern part of the United States.

== Subspecies ==
These three subspecies belong to the species Nebria sahlbergii:

- Nebria sahlbergii modoc Kavanaugh, 1979 (California) - modoc gazelle beetle
- Nebria sahlbergii sahlbergii Fischer von Waldheim, 1828 (the United States, Canada, and Alaska) - Sahlberg's gazelle beetle
- Nebria sahlbergii triad Kavanaugh, 1979 (California) - trinity gazelle beetle
