= Nebria bousqueti =

Scientific classification
- Kingdom: Animalia
- Phylum: Arthropoda
- Clade: Pancrustacea
- Class: Insecta
- Order: Coleoptera
- Suborder: Adephaga
- Family: Carabidae
- Genus: Nebria
- Species: N. bousqueti

Binomial name
- Nebria bousqueti Ledoux & Roux, 1993

Species of beetle

Nebria bousqueti is a species of ground beetle in the Nebriinae subfamily that can be found in China and Taiwan.
