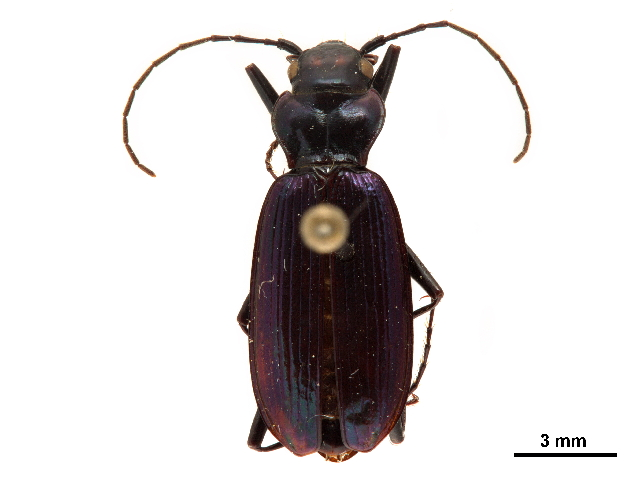

Scientific classification
- Kingdom: Animalia
- Phylum: Arthropoda
- Class: Insecta
- Order: Coleoptera
- Suborder: Adephaga
- Family: Carabidae
- Genus: Nebria
- Species: N. purpurata

Binomial name
- Nebria purpurata LeConte, 1878

Synonyms
- Nebria mobilis Casey, 1913

= Nebria purpurata =

Species of beetle

Nebria purpurata, the purple gazelle beetle, is a species of black coloured ground beetle from the Nebriinae subfamily that is endemic to the US states of Colorado and New Mexico, where it is found in mountainous, subalpine and alpine zones, along cold mountain streams.

Adults are brachypterous, nocturnal and carnivorous.
