= Nebria shibanaii sakagutii =

Scientific classification
- Domain: Eukaryota
- Kingdom: Animalia
- Phylum: Arthropoda
- Class: Insecta
- Order: Coleoptera
- Suborder: Adephaga
- Family: Carabidae
- Genus: Nebria
- Species: N. shibanaii
- Subspecies: N. s. sakagutii

Trinomial name
- Nebria shibanaii sakagutii Nakane, 1957

Subspecies of beetle

Nebria shibanaii sakagutii is a subspecies of ground beetle in the Nebriinae subfamily that is endemic to Japan.
