= Nebria ingens =

Scientific classification
- Domain: Eukaryota
- Kingdom: Animalia
- Phylum: Arthropoda
- Class: Insecta
- Order: Coleoptera
- Suborder: Adephaga
- Family: Carabidae
- Genus: Nebria
- Species: N. ingens

Binomial name
- Nebria ingens Horn, 1870

Synonyms
- Nebria raveni Van Dyke, 1953

Species of beetle

Nebria ingens is a species of ground beetle in the Nebriinae subfamily that is endemic to the US state of California, where it inhabits areas near glaciers, snowfields and runoff streams in the mountains.

Adults are brachypterous, nocturnal and carnivorous.

== Subspecies ==
- Nebria ingens ingens (California) - cup-footed gazelle beetle
- Nebria ingens riversi Van Dyke 1925 (California) - River's gazelle beetle
