= Nebria adjarica =

Scientific classification
- Kingdom: Animalia
- Phylum: Arthropoda
- Class: Insecta
- Order: Coleoptera
- Suborder: Adephaga
- Family: Carabidae
- Genus: Nebria
- Species: N. adjarica

Binomial name
- Nebria adjarica Shilenkov, 1983

Species of beetle

Nebria adjarica is a species of black coloured ground beetle in the Nebriinae subfamily that is endemic to Turkey.
