= Nebria fontinalis fontinalis =

Scientific classification
- Domain: Eukaryota
- Kingdom: Animalia
- Phylum: Arthropoda
- Class: Insecta
- Order: Coleoptera
- Suborder: Adephaga
- Family: Carabidae
- Genus: Nebria
- Species: N. fontinalis
- Subspecies: N. f. fontinalis

Trinomial name
- Nebria fontinalis fontinalis K. Daniel & J. Daniel, 1890

Subspecies of beetle

Nebria fontinalis fontinalis is a subspecies of ground beetle in the Nebriinae subfamily that can be found in Italy and Switzerland.
