= Nebria alpicola =

Scientific classification
- Kingdom: Animalia
- Phylum: Arthropoda
- Class: Insecta
- Order: Coleoptera
- Suborder: Adephaga
- Family: Carabidae
- Genus: Nebria
- Species: N. alpicola

Binomial name
- Nebria alpicola Motschulsky, 1866

Species of beetle

Nebria alpicola is a species of ground beetle from Nebriinae subfamily that is endemic to Turkey.
