= Nebria splendida =

Scientific classification
- Domain: Eukaryota
- Kingdom: Animalia
- Phylum: Arthropoda
- Class: Insecta
- Order: Coleoptera
- Suborder: Adephaga
- Family: Carabidae
- Genus: Nebria
- Species: N. splendida

Binomial name
- Nebria splendida Fischer von Waldheim, 1844

Species of beetle

Nebria splendida is a species of ground beetle in the Nebriinae subfamily that is endemic to Kazakhstan.
