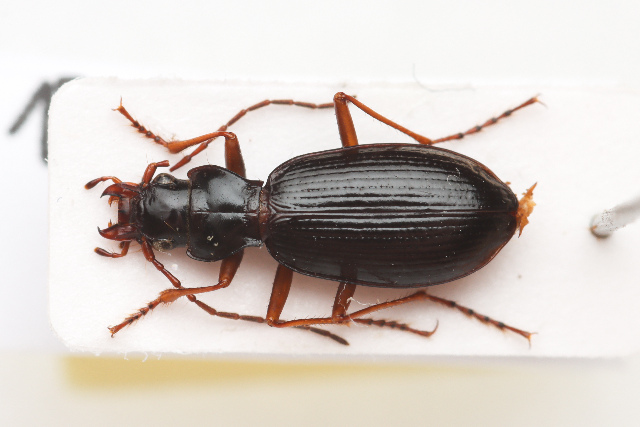

Scientific classification
- Kingdom: Animalia
- Phylum: Arthropoda
- Class: Insecta
- Order: Coleoptera
- Suborder: Adephaga
- Family: Carabidae
- Subfamily: Nebriinae
- Tribe: Nebriini
- Genus: Nebria
- Species: N. germarii

Binomial name
- Nebria germarii Heer, 1837

Synonyms
- Nebria novaki Vsetecka, 1929; Nebria absoloni Obenberger, 1917; Nebria gamasifex Gistel, 1857; Nebria impar Schauberger, 1927

= Nebria germarii =

Species of beetle

Nebria germarii is a species of ground beetle in the Nebriinae subfamily that can be found in Austria, Germany, Italy, Liechtenstein, Switzerland, and in every state of former Yugoslavia, except for North Macedonia.

== Subspecies ==
These six subspecies belong to the species Nebria germarii:

- Nebria germarii absoloni Obenberger, 1917
- Nebria germarii durmitorensis Apfelbeck, 1904 (Bosnia-Herzegovina, former Yugoslavia, Montenegro, Albania)
- Nebria germarii germarii Heer, 1837 (Germany, Switzerland, Austria)
- Nebria germarii norica Schauberger, 1927 (Germany, Austria)
- Nebria germarii novaki Vsetecka, 1929 (Croatia)
- Nebria germarii simonyi Ganglbauer, 1891 (Austria, Italy, Slovenia)
