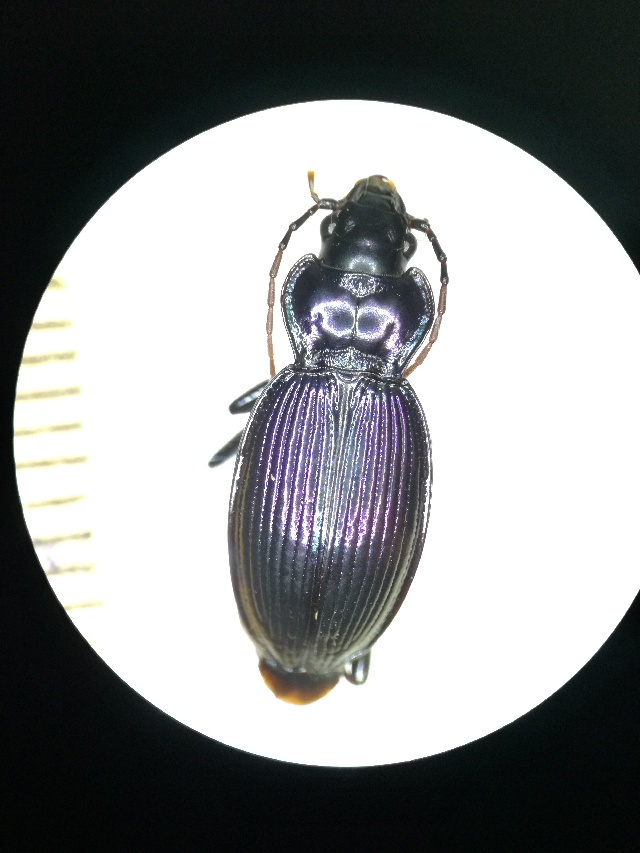

Scientific classification
- Kingdom: Animalia
- Phylum: Arthropoda
- Class: Insecta
- Order: Coleoptera
- Suborder: Adephaga
- Family: Carabidae
- Subfamily: Nebriinae
- Tribe: Nebriini
- Genus: Nebria
- Species: N. kratteri

Binomial name
- Nebria kratteri Dejean & Boisduval, 1831

= Nebria kratteri =

Species of beetle

Nebria kratteri is a species in the beetle family Carabidae. It is found in Italy, North Macedonia, Albania, and Greece.

== Subspecies ==
These three subspecies belong to the species Nebria kratteri:

- Nebria kratteri kratteri Dejean, 1831 (Italy)
- Nebria kratteri pindica Jeanne, 1974 (Greece)
- Nebria kratteri valonensis Apfelbeck, 1904 (North Macedonia and Albania)
