= Nebria fontinalis =

Scientific classification
- Domain: Eukaryota
- Kingdom: Animalia
- Phylum: Arthropoda
- Class: Insecta
- Order: Coleoptera
- Suborder: Adephaga
- Family: Carabidae
- Genus: Nebria
- Species: N. fontinalis

Binomial name
- Nebria fontinalis K. Daniel & J. Daniel, 1890

Species of beetle

Nebria fontinalis is a species of ground beetle in the Nebriinae subfamily that can be found in Italy and Switzerland.

== Subspecies ==
The species have only 2 subspecies, all of which are found in Italy and Switzerland:

- Nebria fontinalis fontinalis K. Daniel et J. Daniel, 1890
- Nebria fontinalis rhaetica K. Daniel et J. Daniel, 1890
