= Nebria composita macra =

Scientific classification
- Domain: Eukaryota
- Kingdom: Animalia
- Phylum: Arthropoda
- Class: Insecta
- Order: Coleoptera
- Suborder: Adephaga
- Family: Carabidae
- Genus: Nebria
- Species: N. composita
- Subspecies: N. c. macra

Trinomial name
- Nebria composita macra Ledoux & Roux, 2005

Subspecies of beetle

Nebria composita macra is a subspecies of ground beetle in the Nebriinae subfamily that is endemic to Tibet.
