= Nebria paradisi =

Scientific classification
- Domain: Eukaryota
- Kingdom: Animalia
- Phylum: Arthropoda
- Class: Insecta
- Order: Coleoptera
- Suborder: Adephaga
- Family: Carabidae
- Subfamily: Nebriinae
- Tribe: Nebriini
- Genus: Nebria
- Species: N. paradisi

Binomial name
- Nebria paradisi Darlington, 1931

Synonyms
- Nebria vandykei Darlington, 1930; Nebria columbiana Van Dyke, 1926

Species of beetle

Nebria paradisi, the paradise gazelle beetle, is a species of ground beetle in the Nebriinae subfamily that can be found in the northern part US state of Oregon. On July 20, 1927, 3 species were discovered in Paradise Valley, Wisconsin. According to A. Smetana, the species are widespread throughout the United States. This species was formerly called Nebria vandykei.

The species may be found at the margins of streams and snowfields. Adults are brachypterous, nocturnal and carnivorous.
