= Nebria steensensis =

Scientific classification
- Kingdom: Animalia
- Phylum: Arthropoda
- Class: Insecta
- Order: Coleoptera
- Suborder: Adephaga
- Family: Carabidae
- Genus: Nebria
- Subgenus: Nebria (Catonebria)
- Species: N. steensensis

Binomial name
- Nebria steensensis Kavanaugh, 1984

Species of beetle

Nebria steensensis, the Steens Mountains gazelle beetle, is a species of ground beetle from the genus Nebria and the subfamily Nebriinae that is endemic to the US state of Oregon, where it can be found along the margins of small streams in upland and mountainous areas.

Adults are brachypterous, nocturnal and carnivorous.
