= Nebria cordicollis gracilis =

Scientific classification
- Domain: Eukaryota
- Kingdom: Animalia
- Phylum: Arthropoda
- Class: Insecta
- Order: Coleoptera
- Suborder: Adephaga
- Family: Carabidae
- Genus: Nebria
- Species: N. cordicollis
- Subspecies: N. c. gracilis

Trinomial name
- Nebria cordicollis gracilis K. Daniel & J. Daniel, 1890

Subspecies of beetle

Nebria cordicollis gracilis is a subspecies of ground beetle in the Nebriinae subfamily that is endemic to Switzerland.
