= Nebria composita composita =

Scientific classification
- Kingdom: Animalia
- Phylum: Arthropoda
- Class: Insecta
- Order: Coleoptera
- Suborder: Adephaga
- Family: Carabidae
- Genus: Nebria
- Species: N. composita
- Subspecies: N. c. composita

Trinomial name
- Nebria composita composita Ledoux & Roux, 1993

Subspecies of beetle

Nebria composita composita is a subspecies of ground beetle in the Nebriinae subfamily that can be found in Qinghai province and Tibet.
