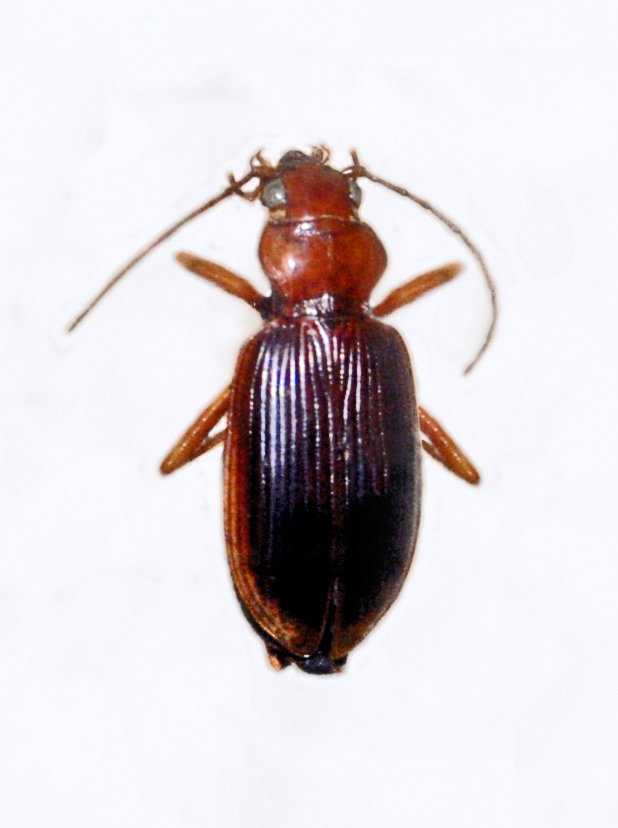
- Nebria psammodes

Scientific classification
- Domain: Eukaryota
- Kingdom: Animalia
- Phylum: Arthropoda
- Class: Insecta
- Order: Coleoptera
- Suborder: Adephaga
- Family: Carabidae
- Genus: Nebria
- Species: N. (E.) psammodes

Binomial name
- Nebria (Eunebria) psammodes (P. Rossi, 1792)

Synonyms
- Carabus psammodes P. Rossi, 1792 [species]; Narbia schreibersii Dejean & Boisduval, 1830

= Nebria psammodes =

Species of beetle

Nebria psammodes is a species of ground beetle in the Nebriinae subfamily.

== Description ==
Nebria psammodes can reach a length of 12–13 millimetres (0.47–0.51 in). Body is black, while the head, the thorax and the outer edge of the elytra are tawny.

== Distribution ==
These beetles are present in Croatia, France, Italy, Slovenia, Switzerland, and the island of Sicily. They can be found on the banks of small alpine streams.
