= Nebria tatrica fatrensis =

Scientific classification
- Domain: Eukaryota
- Kingdom: Animalia
- Phylum: Arthropoda
- Class: Insecta
- Order: Coleoptera
- Suborder: Adephaga
- Family: Carabidae
- Genus: Nebria
- Species: N. tatrica
- Subspecies: N. t. fatrensis

Trinomial name
- Nebria tatrica fatrensis Hurka & Pulpan, 1992

Synonyms
- Alpaeus tatrica fatrensis

Subspecies of beetle

Nebria tatrica fatrensis is a subspecies of ground beetle in the Nebriinae subfamily that is endemic to the mountain range of Velká Fatra in Slovakia, and Czech Republic.
