= Nebria tatrica =

Scientific classification
- Kingdom: Animalia
- Phylum: Arthropoda
- Class: Insecta
- Order: Coleoptera
- Suborder: Adephaga
- Family: Carabidae
- Genus: Nebria
- Species: N. tatrica

Binomial name
- Nebria tatrica L. Miller, 1859

Synonyms
- Alpaeus tatrica

Species of beetle

Nebria tatrica is a species of ground beetle in the Nebriinae subfamily that can be found in Poland, Czech Republic and Slovakia.

== Subspecies ==
The species have 4 subspecies:

- Nebria tatrica dumbirensis Pulpan, 1957
- Nebria tatrica fatrensis Hurka & Pulpan, 1992
- Nebria tatrica komareki Hurka & Pulpan, 1992
- Nebria tatrica tatrica L. Miller, 1859
