= Nebria fallaciosa farkaci =

Scientific classification
- Kingdom: Animalia
- Phylum: Arthropoda
- Class: Insecta
- Order: Coleoptera
- Suborder: Adephaga
- Family: Carabidae
- Genus: Nebria
- Species: N. fallaciosa
- Subspecies: N. f. farkaci

Trinomial name
- Nebria fallaciosa farkaci Ledoux & Roux, 1996

Synonyms
- Nebria tryznaiana Ledoux & Roux, 1998

Subspecies of beetle

Nebria fallaciosa farkaci is a subspecies of ground beetle in the Nebriinae subfamily that is endemic to the Shanxi province of China.
