= Nebria cordicollis cordicollis =

Scientific classification
- Domain: Eukaryota
- Kingdom: Animalia
- Phylum: Arthropoda
- Class: Insecta
- Order: Coleoptera
- Suborder: Adephaga
- Family: Carabidae
- Genus: Nebria
- Species: N. cordicollis
- Subspecies: N. c. cordicollis

Trinomial name
- Nebria cordicollis cordicollis Chaudoir, 1837

Subspecies of beetle

Nebria cordicollis cordicollis is a subspecies of ground beetle in the Nebriinae subfamily that can be found in Italy and Switzerland.
