= Nebria viridipennis =

Scientific classification
- Kingdom: Animalia
- Phylum: Arthropoda
- Class: Insecta
- Order: Coleoptera
- Suborder: Adephaga
- Family: Carabidae
- Genus: Nebria
- Species: N. viridipennis

Binomial name
- Nebria viridipennis Reitter, 1885

Species of beetle

Nebria viridipennis is a species of black coloured ground beetle from Nebriinae subfamily that can be found in Georgia and Russia. The species are 13 millimetres (0.51 in) long.
