= Nippononebria campbelli =

Scientific classification
- Kingdom: Animalia
- Phylum: Arthropoda
- Clade: Pancrustacea
- Class: Insecta
- Order: Coleoptera
- Suborder: Adephaga
- Family: Carabidae
- Subfamily: Nebriinae
- Tribe: Nebriini
- Genus: Nippononebria
- Species: N. campbelli

Binomial name
- Nippononebria campbelli (Kavanaugh, 1984)

Synonyms
- Nebria campbelli Kavanaugh, 1984

Species of beetle

Nippononebria campbelli, Campbell's false gazelle beetle, is a species of ground beetle from the Nebriinae family found in high montane areas in north-central Washington such as Mount Baker and south-central British Columbia such as Manning Provincial Park. Despite historically being described as a Nebria species, the genus Nippononebria is now known to be most closely related to Leistus.

Adults are nocturnal and carnivorous.

== Etymology ==
The species name campbelli is in honor of J. Milton Campbell, the collector of the only female known as of 1984.

== Description ==
Its head is a uniform dark color, lacking white spots on the top between the eyes, with short, distinct paraglossae on the labium, and lateral lobes pointed at the apex of the ligula. The pronotum is somewhat egg-shaped, long and narrow, with the curve at the base of the lateral margin being short and deep, the angles at the base being toothed laterally, and seta along the middle of the sides. The elytra's silhouette is narrowed toward the base, roughly egg-shaped, with the humeri being distinctly keeled. The metepisternum lacks indents. All tarsomeres on the rear tarsus are smooth on top. The 4th tarsomere is shortened ventrally, with the setae on the middle and side of the ventral apex being symmetrically spaced and sized.
