= Nebria shibanaii =

Scientific classification
- Domain: Eukaryota
- Kingdom: Animalia
- Phylum: Arthropoda
- Class: Insecta
- Order: Coleoptera
- Suborder: Adephaga
- Family: Carabidae
- Genus: Nebria
- Species: N. shibanaii

Binomial name
- Nebria shibanaii Ueno, 1955

Species of beetle

Nebria shibanaii is a species of ground beetle in the Nebriinae subfamily that can be found in Japan and Russia.

== Subspecies ==
- Nebria shibanaii sakagutii Nakane, 1957 Japan
- Nebria shibanaii shibanaii Ueno, 1955 Russia
