= Nebria laticollis laticollis =

Scientific classification
- Kingdom: Animalia
- Phylum: Arthropoda
- Class: Insecta
- Order: Coleoptera
- Suborder: Adephaga
- Family: Carabidae
- Genus: Nebria
- Species: N. laticollis
- Subspecies: N. l. laticollis

Trinomial name
- Nebria laticollis laticollis Dejean, 1826

Subspecies of beetle

Nebria laticollis laticollis is a subspecies of ground beetle in the Nebriinae subfamily that can be found in France, Italy, and Switzerland.
