= Nebria calva =

Scientific classification
- Kingdom: Animalia
- Phylum: Arthropoda
- Class: Insecta
- Order: Coleoptera
- Suborder: Adephaga
- Family: Carabidae
- Genus: Nebria
- Species: N. calva

Binomial name
- Nebria calva Kavanaugh, 1984

Species of beetle

Nebria calva, the Mount Baldy gazelle beetle, is a species of beetle from the genus Nebria and the subfamily Nebriinae that is endemic to the US state of Utah, where it is found in mountainous coniferous forests.

Adults are brachypterous, nocturnal and carnivorous.
