= Nebria rubripes =

Scientific classification
- Domain: Eukaryota
- Kingdom: Animalia
- Phylum: Arthropoda
- Class: Insecta
- Order: Coleoptera
- Suborder: Adephaga
- Family: Carabidae
- Genus: Nebria
- Species: N. rubripes

Binomial name
- Nebria rubripes Audinet-Serville, 1821

Synonyms
- Nebria atripes Pic, 1891; Nebria intermediiformis Pic, 1911

Species of beetle

Nebria rubripes is a species of ground beetle in the Nebriinae subfamily that can be found in France and Spain.

== Subspecies ==
The species have 3 subspecies that could be found in France and Spain:

- Nebria rubripes olivieri Dejean, 1826 France, Spain
- Nebria rubripes rousseleti Ledoux & Roux, 1988 France
- Nebria rubripes rubripes Audinet-Serville, 1821 France
