= Nebria tenella saridaghensis =

Scientific classification
- Domain: Eukaryota
- Kingdom: Animalia
- Phylum: Arthropoda
- Class: Insecta
- Order: Coleoptera
- Suborder: Adephaga
- Family: Carabidae
- Genus: Nebria
- Species: N. tenella
- Subspecies: N. t. saridaghensis

Trinomial name
- Nebria tenella saridaghensis Shilenkov, 1983

Subspecies of beetle

Nebria tenella saridaghensis is a subspecies of ground beetle in the Nebriinae subfamily that is endemic to Caucasus.
