= Nebria laticollis allobrogica =

Scientific classification
- Domain: Eukaryota
- Kingdom: Animalia
- Phylum: Arthropoda
- Class: Insecta
- Order: Coleoptera
- Suborder: Adephaga
- Family: Carabidae
- Genus: Nebria
- Species: N. laticollis
- Subspecies: N. l. allobrogica

Trinomial name
- Nebria laticollis allobrogica Jeanne, 1976

Subspecies of beetle

Nebria laticollis allobrogica is a subspecies of ground beetle in the Nebriinae subfamily that is endemic to France.
