= Nebria angusticollis microcephala =

Scientific classification
- Domain: Eukaryota
- Kingdom: Animalia
- Phylum: Arthropoda
- Class: Insecta
- Order: Coleoptera
- Suborder: Adephaga
- Family: Carabidae
- Genus: Nebria
- Species: N. angusticollis
- Subspecies: N. a. microcephala

Trinomial name
- Nebria angusticollis microcephala K. Daniel & D. Daniel, 1891

Subspecies of beetle

Nebria angusticollis microcephala is a subspecies of ground beetle in the Nebriinae subfamily that can be found in the Alps of France, Italy, and Switzerland.
