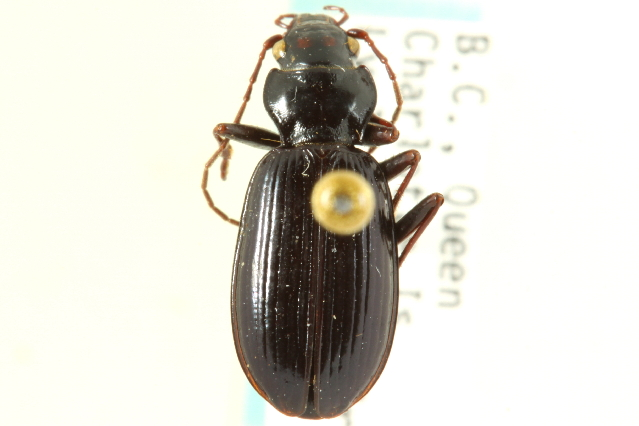

Scientific classification
- Kingdom: Animalia
- Phylum: Arthropoda
- Clade: Pancrustacea
- Class: Insecta
- Order: Coleoptera
- Suborder: Adephaga
- Family: Carabidae
- Subfamily: Nebriinae
- Tribe: Nebriini
- Genus: Nebria
- Species: N. louiseae

Binomial name
- Nebria louiseae Kavanaugh, 1984

Synonyms
- Nebria louisae

= Nebria louiseae =

Species of beetle

Nebria louiseae, the South Moresby gazelle beetle, is a species in the beetle family Carabidae. It is found only on Moresby Island, Haida Gwaii, BC, Canada, where it inhabits sea beaches shaded by adjacent forests.

Adults are brachypterous, nocturnal and carnivorous.
