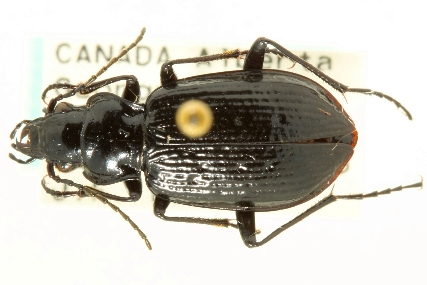

Scientific classification
- Domain: Eukaryota
- Kingdom: Animalia
- Phylum: Xenacoelomorpha
- Order: Acoela
- Family: Actinoposthiidae
- Genus: Pelophila
- Species: P. rudis

Binomial name
- Pelophila rudis (LeConte, 1863)

Synonyms
- Nebria rudis LeConte, 1863

= Pelophila rudis =

Species of beetle

Pelophila rudis, the wild mud-loving beetle, is a species of black coloured ground beetle in the subfamily Nebriinae which was described by John Lawrence LeConte in 1863. The species can be found in Canada and Arkansas, United States.

The habitat consists of dense, wet vegetation at the margins of eutrophic marshes, marshy borders of slow streams, swamps, and lakeside forests near sandy lake shores. Both the adults and larvae are predatory.
