= Nebria hellwigii hellwigii =

Scientific classification
- Domain: Eukaryota
- Kingdom: Animalia
- Phylum: Arthropoda
- Class: Insecta
- Order: Coleoptera
- Suborder: Adephaga
- Family: Carabidae
- Genus: Nebria
- Species: N. hellwigii
- Subspecies: N. h. hellwigii

Trinomial name
- Nebria hellwigii hellwigii Panzer, 1803

Subspecies of beetle

Nebria hellwigii hellwigii is a subspecies of beetle in the family Carabidae found in Austria, Germany, and Italy.
