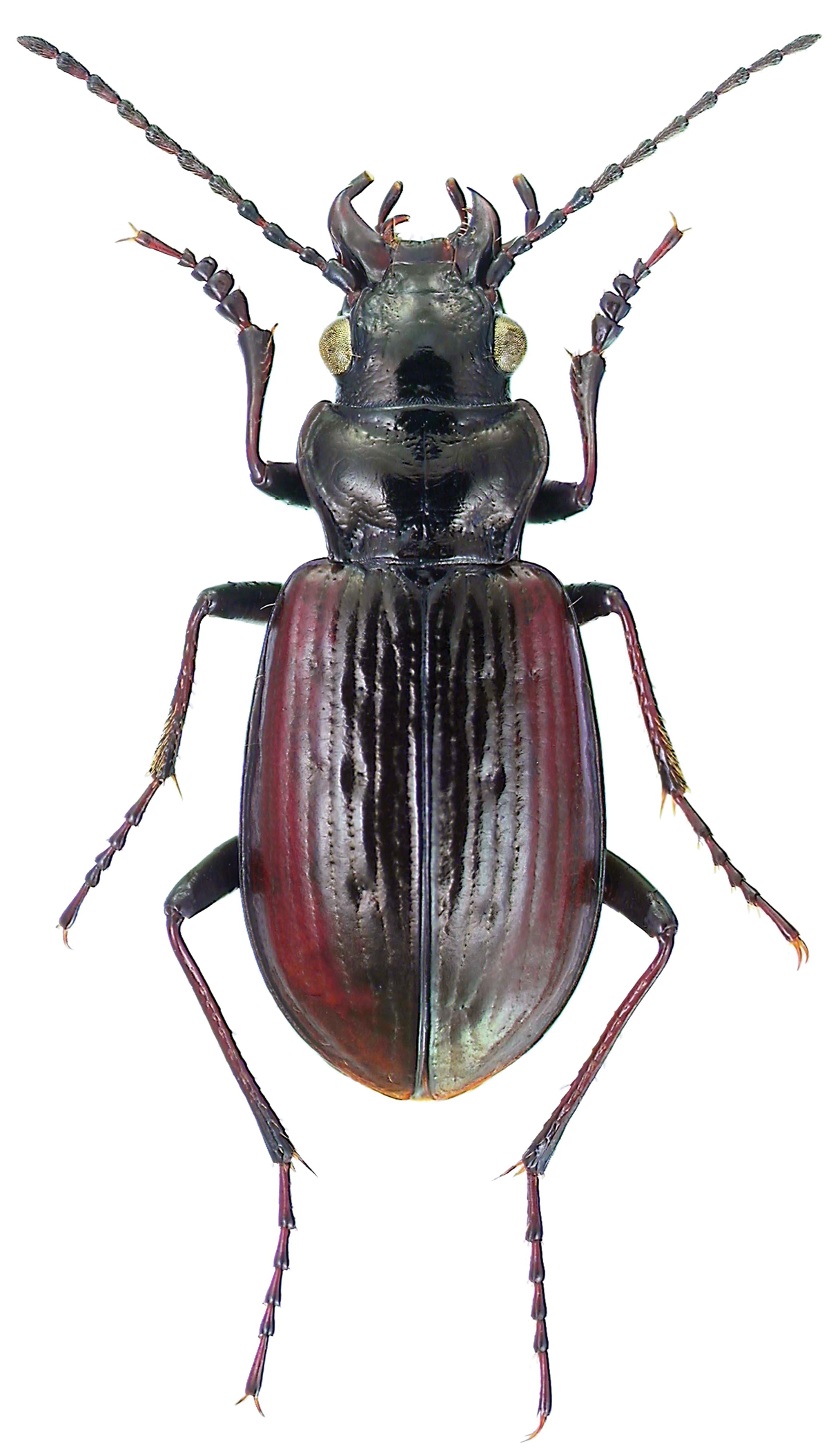

Scientific classification
- Kingdom: Animalia
- Phylum: Xenacoelomorpha
- Order: Acoela
- Family: Actinoposthiidae
- Genus: Pelophila
- Species: P. borealis

Binomial name
- Pelophila borealis (Paykull, 1790)

Synonyms
- Pelophila angusticollis Motschulsky, 1860; Pelophila arctica Dejean, 1826; Pelophila californica Motschulsky, 1844; Pelophila costata Menetries, 1851; Pelophila dejeani Dejean, 1826; Pelophila elongata Mannenheim, 1823; Pelophila eschscholtzii Mannerheim, 1823; Pelophila gebleri Mannerheim, 1823; Pelophila laevigata Motschulsky, 1844; Pelophila marginata Mannenheim, 1823; Pelophila ochotica R. F. Sahlberg, 1844; Pelophila shermani Casey, 1913; Pelophila ulkei G. H. Horn, 1870

= Pelophila borealis =

Species of beetle

Pelophila borealis, the boreal mud-loving beetle, is a species of ground beetle in Nebriinae subfamily which was described by Gustaf von Paykull in 1790. The species can be found in Belarus, Canada, Estonia, Finland, Latvia, Norway, Russia, and Sweden. It is black in colour and is shiny. The species ranges from 9.5–10.1 millimetres (0.37–0.40 in) in length.
