= Trechus albanicus =

Scientific classification
- Kingdom: Animalia
- Phylum: Arthropoda
- Class: Insecta
- Order: Coleoptera
- Suborder: Adephaga
- Family: Carabidae
- Genus: Trechus
- Species: T. albanicus

Binomial name
- Trechus albanicus Apfelbeck, 1907

Species of beetle

Trechus albanicus is a species of ground beetle in the subfamily Trechinae. It was described by Apfelbeck in 1907.
