= Nebria lariollei lariollei =

Scientific classification
- Domain: Eukaryota
- Kingdom: Animalia
- Phylum: Arthropoda
- Class: Insecta
- Order: Coleoptera
- Suborder: Adephaga
- Family: Carabidae
- Genus: Nebria
- Species: N. lariollei
- Subspecies: N. l. lariollei

Trinomial name
- Nebria lariollei lariollei Germiny, 1865

Subspecies of beetle

Nebria lariollei lariollei is a subspecies of beetle in the family Carabidae that is endemic to France.
