= Nebria hellwigii chalcicola =

Scientific classification
- Domain: Eukaryota
- Kingdom: Animalia
- Phylum: Arthropoda
- Class: Insecta
- Order: Coleoptera
- Suborder: Adephaga
- Family: Carabidae
- Genus: Nebria
- Species: N. hellwigii
- Subspecies: N. h. chalcicola

Trinomial name
- Nebria hellwigii chalcicola Franz, 1949

Subspecies of beetle

Nebria hellwigii chalcicola is a subspecies of beetle in the family Carabidae that is endemic to Austria.
