= Clivina pfisteri =

Scientific classification
- Domain: Eukaryota
- Kingdom: Animalia
- Phylum: Arthropoda
- Class: Insecta
- Order: Coleoptera
- Suborder: Adephaga
- Family: Carabidae
- Genus: Clivina
- Species: C. pfisteri

Binomial name
- Clivina pfisteri Andrewes, 1930

Species of beetle

Clivina pfisteri is a species of ground beetle in the subfamily Scaritinae. It was described by Andrewes in 1930.
