= Abacetus abor =

Scientific classification
- Kingdom: Animalia
- Phylum: Arthropoda
- Class: Insecta
- Order: Coleoptera
- Suborder: Adephaga
- Family: Carabidae
- Genus: Abacetus
- Species: A. abor

Binomial name
- Abacetus abor Andrewes, 1942

Species of beetle

Abacetus abor is a species of ground beetle in the subfamily Pterostichinae. It was described by Herbert Edward Andrewes in 1942 and is found in India.
