= Nippononebria altisierrae =

Scientific classification
- Domain: Eukaryota
- Kingdom: Animalia
- Phylum: Arthropoda
- Class: Insecta
- Order: Coleoptera
- Suborder: Adephaga
- Family: Carabidae
- Subfamily: Nebriinae
- Tribe: Nebriini
- Genus: Nippononebria
- Species: N. altisierrae

Binomial name
- Nippononebria altisierrae (Kavanaugh, 1984)

Synonyms
- Nebria altisierrae Kavanaugh, 1984

Species of beetle

Nippononebria altisierrae, the high sierra false gazelle beetle, is a species of black colored ground beetle in the family Carabidae, A member of the subgenus Vancouveria. It is found in California, where it inhabits meadows in the mountains.

Adults are nocturnal and carnivorous.
