= Nippononebria pusilla =

Scientific classification
- Domain: Eukaryota
- Kingdom: Animalia
- Phylum: Arthropoda
- Class: Insecta
- Order: Coleoptera
- Suborder: Adephaga
- Family: Carabidae
- Subfamily: Nebriinae
- Tribe: Nebriini
- Genus: Nippononebria
- Species: N. pusilla

Binomial name
- Nippononebria pusilla (Ueno, 1955)

Synonyms
- Nebria pusilla Ueno, 1955; Nippononebria teres Habu, 1958; Nebria yatsuana

Species of beetle

Nippononebria pusilla is a species of black-coloured ground beetle in the Nebriinae subfamily that is endemic to Japan. The species has two subspecies, Nippononebria pusilla pusilla and Nippononebria pusilla yatsuana; both of these subspecies can be found in the same nation.

== Subspecies ==
- Nippononebria pusilla pusilla
- Nippononebria pusilla yatsuana Nakane, 1960
