= Nebria lariollei =

Scientific classification
- Domain: Eukaryota
- Kingdom: Animalia
- Phylum: Arthropoda
- Class: Insecta
- Order: Coleoptera
- Suborder: Adephaga
- Family: Carabidae
- Genus: Nebria
- Species: N. lariollei

Binomial name
- Nebria lariollei Germiny, 1865

Species of beetle

Nebria lariollei is a species of beetle in the family Carabidae that is endemic to France.

== Subspecies ==
The species have only 2 subspecies, all of which are found in Italy and Switzerland:

- Nebria lariollei gaudini Jeannel, 1942
- Nebria lariollei lariollei Germiny, 1865
