= Nippononebria sawadai =

Scientific classification
- Domain: Eukaryota
- Kingdom: Animalia
- Phylum: Arthropoda
- Class: Insecta
- Order: Coleoptera
- Suborder: Adephaga
- Family: Carabidae
- Subfamily: Nebriinae
- Tribe: Nebriini
- Genus: Nippononebria
- Species: N. sawadai

Binomial name
- Nippononebria sawadai Nakane, 1979

Synonyms
- Nebria sawadai (Nakane, 1979)

Species of beetle

Nippononebria sawadai is a species of ground beetle in the Nebriinae subfamily that is endemic to Japan.
