= Nippononebria changbaiensis =

Scientific classification
- Kingdom: Animalia
- Phylum: Arthropoda
- Class: Insecta
- Order: Coleoptera
- Suborder: Adephaga
- Family: Carabidae
- Subfamily: Nebriinae
- Tribe: Nebriini
- Genus: Nippononebria
- Species: N. changbaiensis

Binomial name
- Nippononebria changbaiensis (Kavanaugh & Liang, 2010)

Synonyms
- Nebria changbaiensis (Kavanaugh & Liang, 2010)

Species of beetle

Nippononebria changbaiensis is a species of metallic green coloured ground beetle from Nebriinae subfamily that is endemic to Jilin province of China.

== Distribution ==
The species can be found in Changbaishan mountains at the height of 1,900–2,000 metres (6,200–6,600 ft). It can also be found on Tianchi waterfall at the height of 2,000–2,600 metres (6,600–8,500 ft). The species is 1 millimetre (0.039 in) long.
