= Harpalus tibeticus =

Scientific classification
- Kingdom: Animalia
- Phylum: Arthropoda
- Class: Insecta
- Order: Coleoptera
- Suborder: Adephaga
- Family: Carabidae
- Genus: Harpalus
- Species: H. tibeticus

Binomial name
- Harpalus tibeticus Andrewes, 1930

Species of beetle

Harpalus tibeticus is a species of ground beetle in the subfamily Harpalinae. It was described by Andrewes in 1930.
