= Paropisthius =

Scientific classification
- Kingdom: Animalia
- Phylum: Arthropoda
- Class: Insecta
- Order: Coleoptera
- Suborder: Adephaga
- Family: Carabidae
- Subfamily: Nebriinae
- Tribe: Opisthiini
- Genus: Paropisthius; Casey, 1920

Genus of beetles

Paropisthius is a genus of ground beetles in the family Carabidae. There are at least four described species in Paropisthius.

== Species ==
These four species belong to the genus Paropisthius:

- Paropisthius davidis (Fairmaire, 1887)
- Paropisthius indicus (Chaudoir, 1863)
- Paropisthius masuzoi Kasahara, 1989
- Paropisthius unctulus Andrewes, 1932
