= Nippononebria chalceola =

Scientific classification
- Domain: Eukaryota
- Kingdom: Animalia
- Phylum: Arthropoda
- Class: Insecta
- Order: Coleoptera
- Suborder: Adephaga
- Family: Carabidae
- Genus: Nippononebria
- Species: N. chalceola

Binomial name
- Nippononebria chalceola (Bates, 1883)

Synonyms
- Nebria (Nippononebria) chalceola Bates, 1883

Species of beetle

Nippononebria chalceola is a species of beetle of the Carabidae family. This species is found in Japan (Honshu, Kyushu).

== Subspecies ==
- Nippononebria chalceola chalceola (Honshu)
- Nippononebria chalceola kyushuensis Habu, 1958 (Kyushu)
