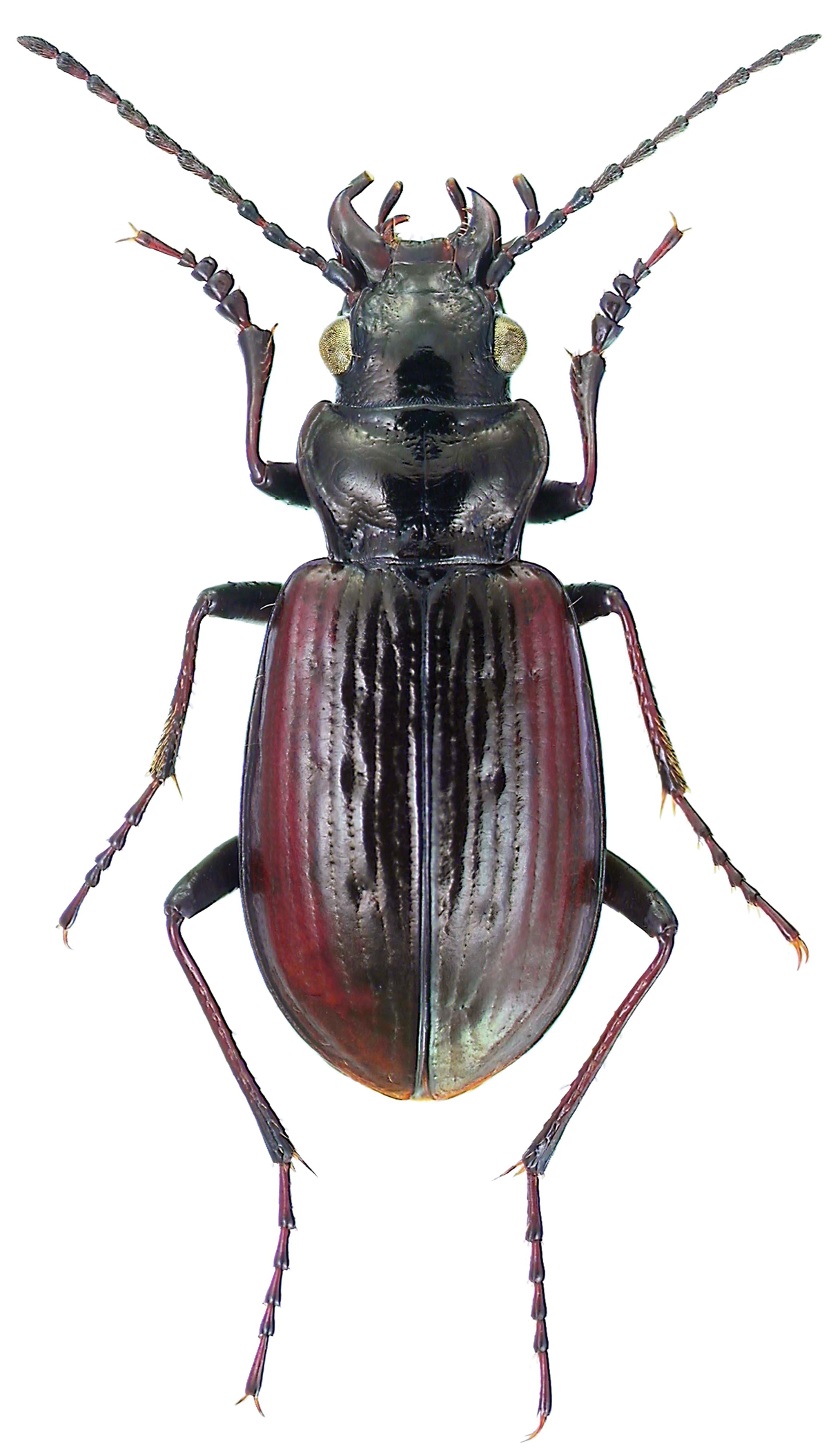
- Pelophila borealis

Scientific classification
- Kingdom: Animalia
- Phylum: Arthropoda
- Class: Insecta
- Order: Coleoptera
- Suborder: Adephaga
- Family: Carabidae
- Subfamily: Nebriinae
- Tribe: Pelophilini
- Genus: Pelophila; Dejean, 1826

= Pelophila =

Genus of beetles

Pelophila is a genus of ground beetles in the family Carabidae. There are two described species in Pelophila.

== Species ==
These two species belong to the genus Pelophila:

- Pelophila borealis (Paykull, 1790)
- Pelophila rudis (LeConte, 1863)
