= Nippononebria horioi =

Scientific classification
- Domain: Eukaryota
- Kingdom: Animalia
- Phylum: Arthropoda
- Class: Insecta
- Order: Coleoptera
- Suborder: Adephaga
- Family: Carabidae
- Genus: Nippononebria
- Species: N. horioi

Binomial name
- Nippononebria horioi Nakane, 1960

Synonyms
- Nebria (Nippononebria) horioi (Nakane, 1960)

Species of beetle

Nippononebria horioi is a species of beetle of the Carabidae family. This species is found in Japan (Honshu).
