= Archaeocindis =

Scientific classification
- Domain: Eukaryota
- Kingdom: Animalia
- Phylum: Arthropoda
- Class: Insecta
- Order: Coleoptera
- Suborder: Adephaga
- Family: Carabidae
- Subfamily: Nebriinae
- Tribe: Cicindini
- Genus: Archaeocindis; Kavanaugh & Erwin, 1991

Genus of beetles

Archaeocindis is a genus of ground beetles in the family Carabidae. There are at least two described species in Archaeocindis.

== Species ==
These two species belong to the genus Archaeocindis:

- Archaeocindis hormozensis Azadbakhsh, 2020
- Archaeocindis johnbeckeri (Bänninger, 1927)
