= Nippononebria =

Scientific classification
- Domain: Eukaryota
- Kingdom: Animalia
- Phylum: Arthropoda
- Class: Insecta
- Order: Coleoptera
- Suborder: Adephaga
- Family: Carabidae
- Subfamily: Nebriinae
- Tribe: Nebriini
- Genus: Nippononebria; Ueno, 1955

Subgenera
- Nippononebria Ueno, 1955; Vancouveria Kavanaugh, 1995

Genus of beetles

Nippononebria is a genus of ground beetles in the family Carabidae. There are about eight described species in Nippononebria.

== Species ==
These eight species belong to the genus Nippononebria:

- Nippononebria
  - Nippononebria chalceola (Bates, 1883) (Japan)
  - Nippononebria changbaiensis Kavanaugh & Liang, 2010 (China)
  - Nippononebria horioi Nakane, 1960 (Japan)
  - Nippononebria pusilla (Ueno, 1955) (Japan)
  - Nippononebria sawadai Nakane, 1979 (Japan)
- Vancouveria Kavanaugh, 1995
  - Nippononebria altisierrae (Kavanaugh, 1984) (Western United States)
  - Nippononebria campbelli (Kavanaugh, 1984) (North America)
  - Nippononebria virescens (G.Horn, 1870) (North America)
