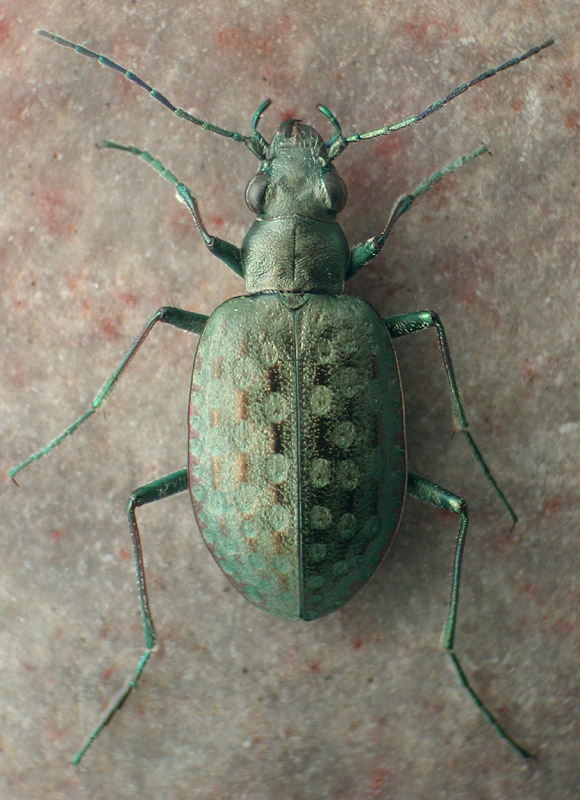

Scientific classification
- Domain: Eukaryota
- Kingdom: Animalia
- Phylum: Arthropoda
- Class: Insecta
- Order: Coleoptera
- Suborder: Adephaga
- Family: Carabidae
- Subfamily: Nebriinae
- Tribe: Opisthiini
- Genus: Opisthius; Kirby, 1837
- Species: O. richardsoni

Binomial name
- Opisthius richardsoni Kirby, 1837

= Opisthius =

Genus of beetles

Opisthius is a genus of ground beetles in the family Carabidae. This genus has a single species, Opisthius richardsoni, Richardson's false marsh and bog beetle, which is found in Canada (Alberta, British Columbia, Northwest Territories, Saskatchewan, Yukon) and the United States (Alaska, California, Colorado, Idaho, Montana, New Mexico, Nevada, Oregon, Utah, Washington, Wyoming). It inhabits the banks of rivers and big brooks.

Larvae have been recorded digging burrows.
