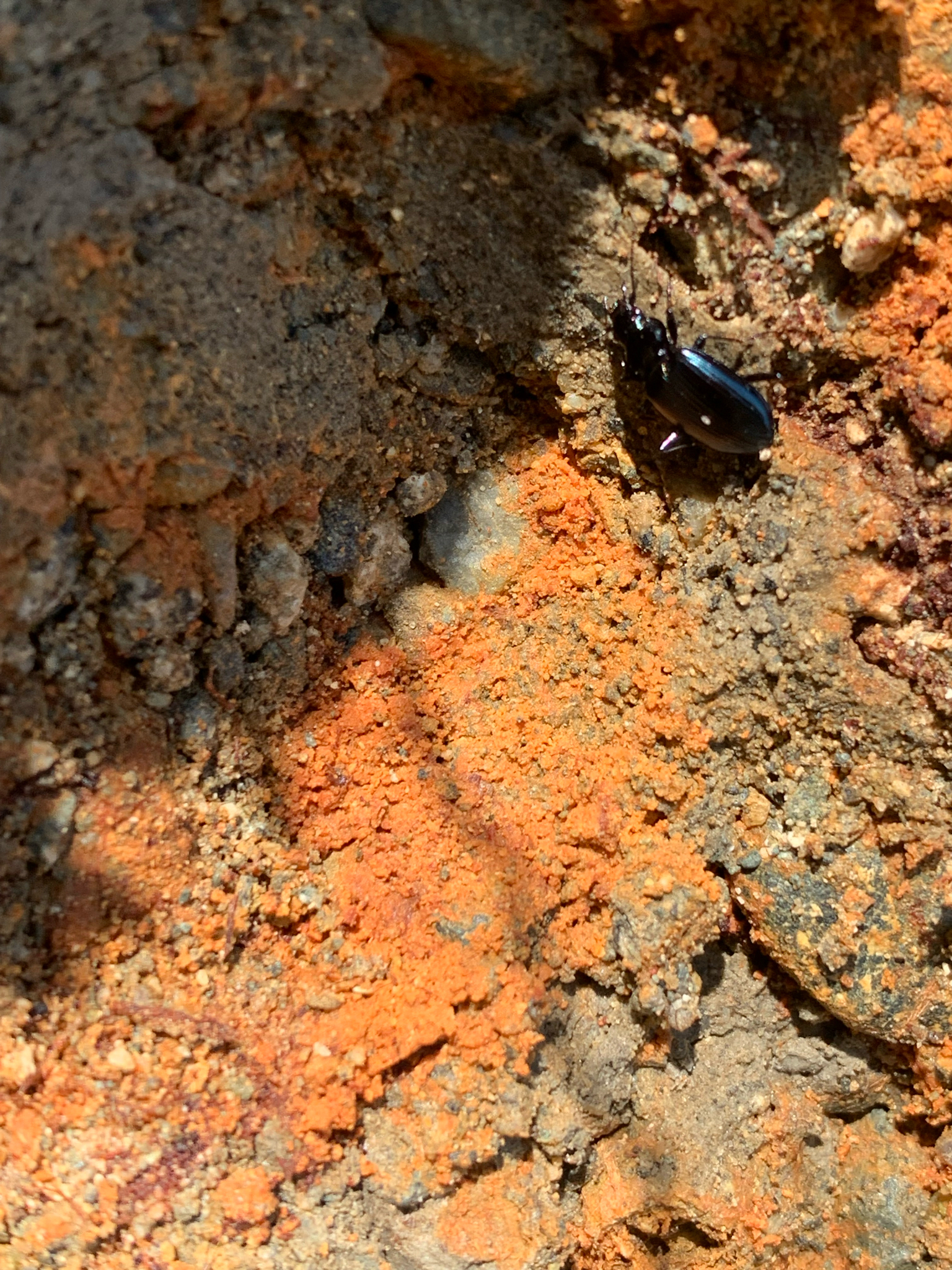

Scientific classification
- Domain: Eukaryota
- Kingdom: Animalia
- Phylum: Arthropoda
- Class: Insecta
- Order: Coleoptera
- Suborder: Adephaga
- Family: Carabidae
- Tribe: Nebriini
- Genus: Nippononebria
- Species: N. virescens

Binomial name
- Nippononebria virescens (G. Horn, 1870)

Synonyms
- Nebria virescens G. Horn, 1870; Nebria brevis Casey, 1913

= Nippononebria virescens =

Species of beetle

Nippononebria virescens, the greenish false gazelle beetle, is a species of ground beetle in the family Carabidae, found in western North America (British Columbia, California, Idaho, Oregon, Washington), where it is found in meadows.

Adults are nocturnal and carnivorous.
