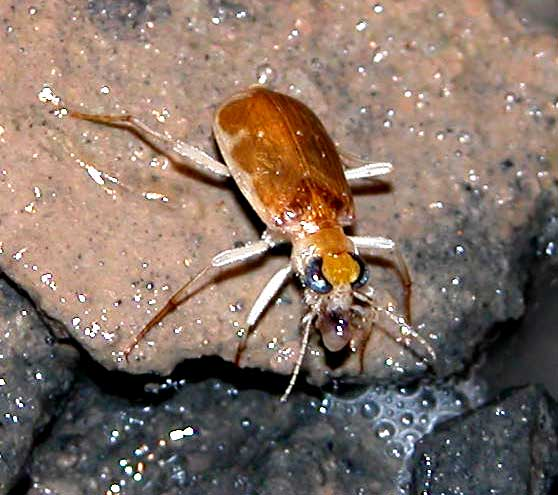
- Cicindis horni

Scientific classification
- Domain: Eukaryota
- Kingdom: Animalia
- Phylum: Arthropoda
- Class: Insecta
- Order: Coleoptera
- Suborder: Adephaga
- Family: Carabidae
- Tribe: Cicindini
- Genus: Cicindis; Bruch, 1908
- Species: C. horni

Binomial name
- Cicindis horni Bruch, 1908

= Cicindis =

Genus of beetles

Cicindis horni, Horn’s fairy shrimp hunting beetle, is a species of beetles in the family Carabidae, the only species in the genus Cicindis. This species is endemic to Argentina, where it inhabits the margins of large salt flats.

The Cicindis classification is designated by autapotypic features including but not limited to a lack of supraorbital setiferous punctures (with these punctures being instead on the basal setiferous), dorsal surface of mandible shown with obliquely transverse grooves, and one or more tarsomeres on each leg with fringes of accessory setae.

Adults surface-swim and dive to find their prey, a fairy shrimp species.
