= Notiokasis =

Scientific classification
- Domain: Eukaryota
- Kingdom: Animalia
- Phylum: Arthropoda
- Class: Insecta
- Order: Coleoptera
- Suborder: Adephaga
- Family: Carabidae
- Tribe: Notiokasiini
- Genus: Notiokasis; Kavanaugh & Nègre, 1983
- Species: N. chaudoiri

Binomial name
- Notiokasis chaudoiri Kavanaugh & Nègre, 1983

Genus of beetles

Notiokasis is a genus of ground beetles in the family Carabidae. This genus contains a single species, Notiokasis chaudoiri, Chaudoir's southern sister beetle, which is found in Brazil and Uruguay, where it inhabits humid subtropical lowlands.
