= Viktor Apfelbeck =

Austrian-Yugoslav biologist (1859–1934)

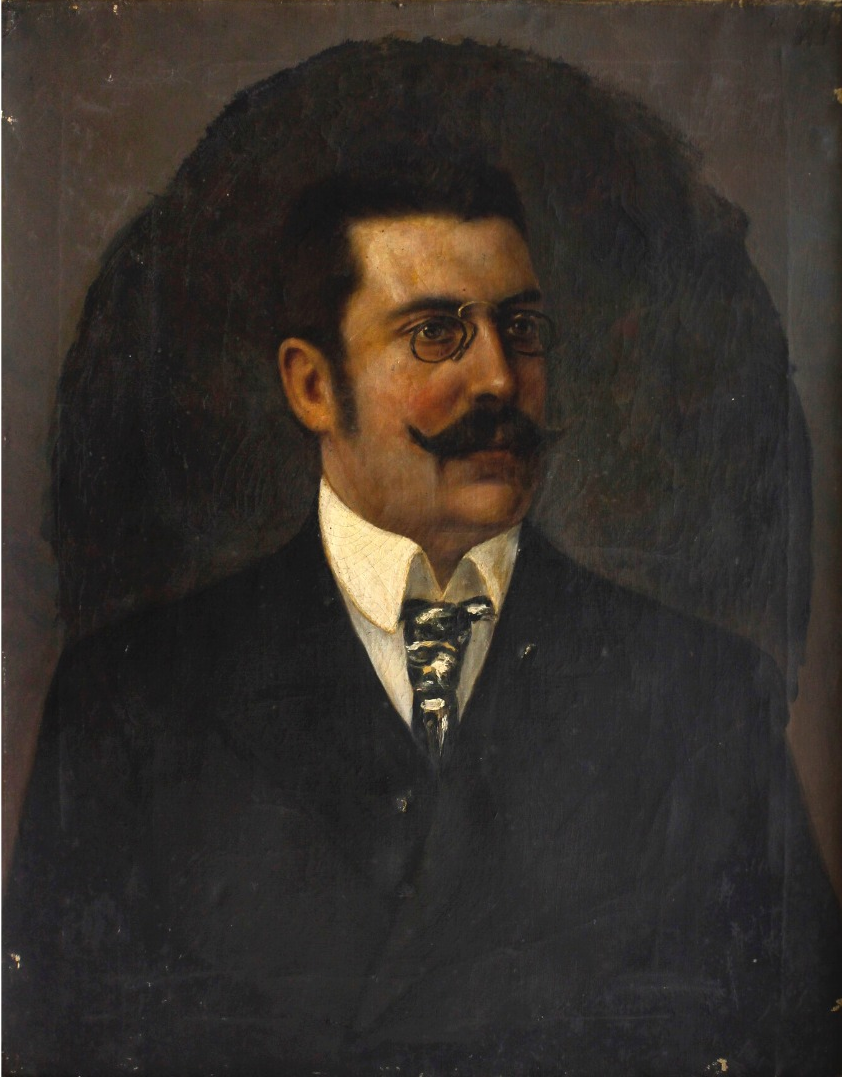

Viktor Apfelbeck (19 April 1859 – 1 May 1934) was a Styrian entomologist and was the first entomological curator at the national museum in Sarajevo. He studied the cave beetles of the region and worked on the beetles of the Balkan peninsular. He described nearly 603 taxa including 5 genera.

Apfelbeck was born in Eisenerz, Styria. He went to the Lehranstalt für Bodenkultur (college of agriculture) in Weißwasser near Teschen and after graduation, he served as a forester for Count Batthyâny in Ludbreg, Croatia, from 1878 to 1886. From 1887 to 1890 he was a forester in Sarajevo and on April 28, 1890 he was appointed curator at the State Museum in Sarajevo. He held the position until his retirement in 1925. He began by collecting insects across the Balkan peninsular, paying special attention to the cave fauna, and the Caraboidea. His research led to the protection of cave fauna in 1914. His collections stood at more than 500,000 specimens. After his retirement he worked on malaria and pest management at the Hygiene institute in Sarajevo until 1932. He published extensively on faunistics between 1889 and 1929.
