= Herbert Edward Andrewes =

English entomologist (1863–1950)

Herbert Edward Andrewes (9 November 1863, Reading – 16 December 1950, Highgate) was a stockbroker and an English entomologist who specialised in the order Coleoptera.

Herbert Andrewes was one of four sons of engineer and mayor of Reading Charles James Andrewes and his wife Charlotte Parsons. His elder brother was the pathologist and bacteriologist Sir Frederick William Andrewes.

Andrewes' initial training was at the forestry school in Nancy, France, now INRA. In 1885, he entered the Indian Forest Service. His next post was at the British Museum (Natural History) where he specialised in Carabidae. He was a prolific author, writing over 120 short scientific papers in addition to catalogues, taxonomic works, faunal monographs and identification manuals. Andrewes was a Fellow of the Royal Entomological Society from 1910 until his death (Council 1920-22). The society holds his library.

== Selected works ==
- (1925) A revision of the Oriental species of the genus Tachys. Ann Mus Civ Stor Nat Genova 51: 327-502.
- (1926) A catalogue of Philippines Carabidae. Philippine Journal of Science 31, 345–361.
- (1931) On the Carabidae of Mount Kinabalu. Federated Malay Museums, Journ. 16: 431-485, map. 1933. On some new species of Carabidae, chiefly from Java. Treubia 14: 273-286.
- (1933) A catalogue of the Carabidae of Sumatra. Tijdschr, v. Ent. 76: 319-382.
- (1929)The Fauna of British India, Including Ceylon and Burma. Carabidae 1. Carabinae 431pp. 62 figs 9 pl. Taylor and Francis, London.
- (1935)The Fauna of British India, Including Ceylon and Burma. Carabidae 2. Harpalinae 323 pp. 51 figs 5 pl. Taylor and Francis, London.

== Collection ==
Most of Andrewes' personal collection is in the Natural History Museum, London, together with beetles from Sikkim collected by Herbert Stevens. Further collections including syntypes and a collection from India, Burma, New Guinea, Natal, Tennessee, including syntypes of Martin Jacoby, Walther Hermann Richard Horn, and Maurice Auguste Régimbart (1900), is in Oxford University Museum. Other parts of Andrewes' collection are in the Natural History Museum of Giacomo Doria, Genoa.
