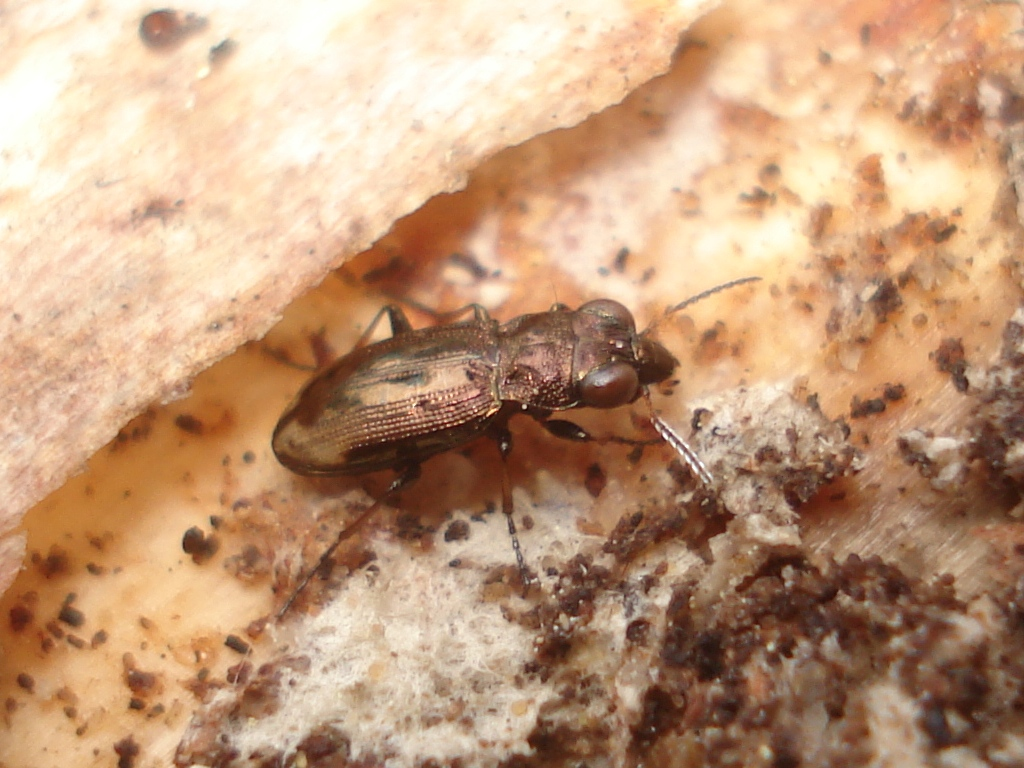
- Notiophilus substriatus

Scientific classification
- Domain: Eukaryota
- Kingdom: Animalia
- Phylum: Arthropoda
- Class: Insecta
- Order: Coleoptera
- Suborder: Adephaga
- Family: Carabidae
- Subfamily: Nebriinae; Laporte, 1834

Tribes
- Cicindini Csiki, 1927; Nebriini Laporte, 1834; Notiokasiini Kavanaugh & Nègre, 1983; Notiophilini Motschulsky, 1850; Opisthiini Dupuis, 1912; Pelophilini Kavanaugh, 1996

= Nebriinae =

Subfamily of beetles

Nebriinae is a subfamily of ground beetles in the family Carabidae. There are about 12 genera and more than 840 described species in Nebriinae.

== Genera ==
These 12 genera belong to the subfamily Nebriinae:

- Archaeocindis Kavanaugh & Erwin, 1991
- Cicindis Bruch, 1908
- Leistus Frölich, 1799
- Nebria Latreille, 1802
- Nippononebria Ueno, 1955
- Notiokasis Kavanaugh & Nègre, 1983
- Notiophilus Duméril, 1805
- Opisthius Kirby, 1837
- Paropisthius Casey, 1920
- Pelophila Dejean, 1821
- † Archaeonebria Kavanaugh & J.Schmidt, 2019
- † Ledouxnebria Deuve, 1998
