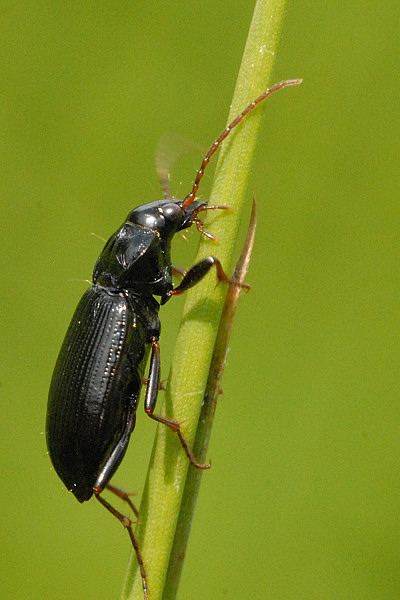
- Nebria brevicollis

Scientific classification
- Kingdom: Animalia
- Phylum: Arthropoda
- Clade: Pancrustacea
- Class: Insecta
- Order: Coleoptera
- Suborder: Adephaga
- Family: Carabidae
- Subfamily: Nebriinae
- Tribe: Nebriini
- Genus: Nebria; Latreille, 1802

Diversity
- More than 500 species

Synonyms
- Archileistobrius Shilenkov & Kryzhanovskij, 1983

= Nebria =

Genus of beetles

Nebria is a genus of ground beetles native to the Palearctic, the Near East and North Africa. There are more than 500 described species in Nebria, inhabiting a very wide diversity of habitats.

== See also ==
- List of Nebria species
