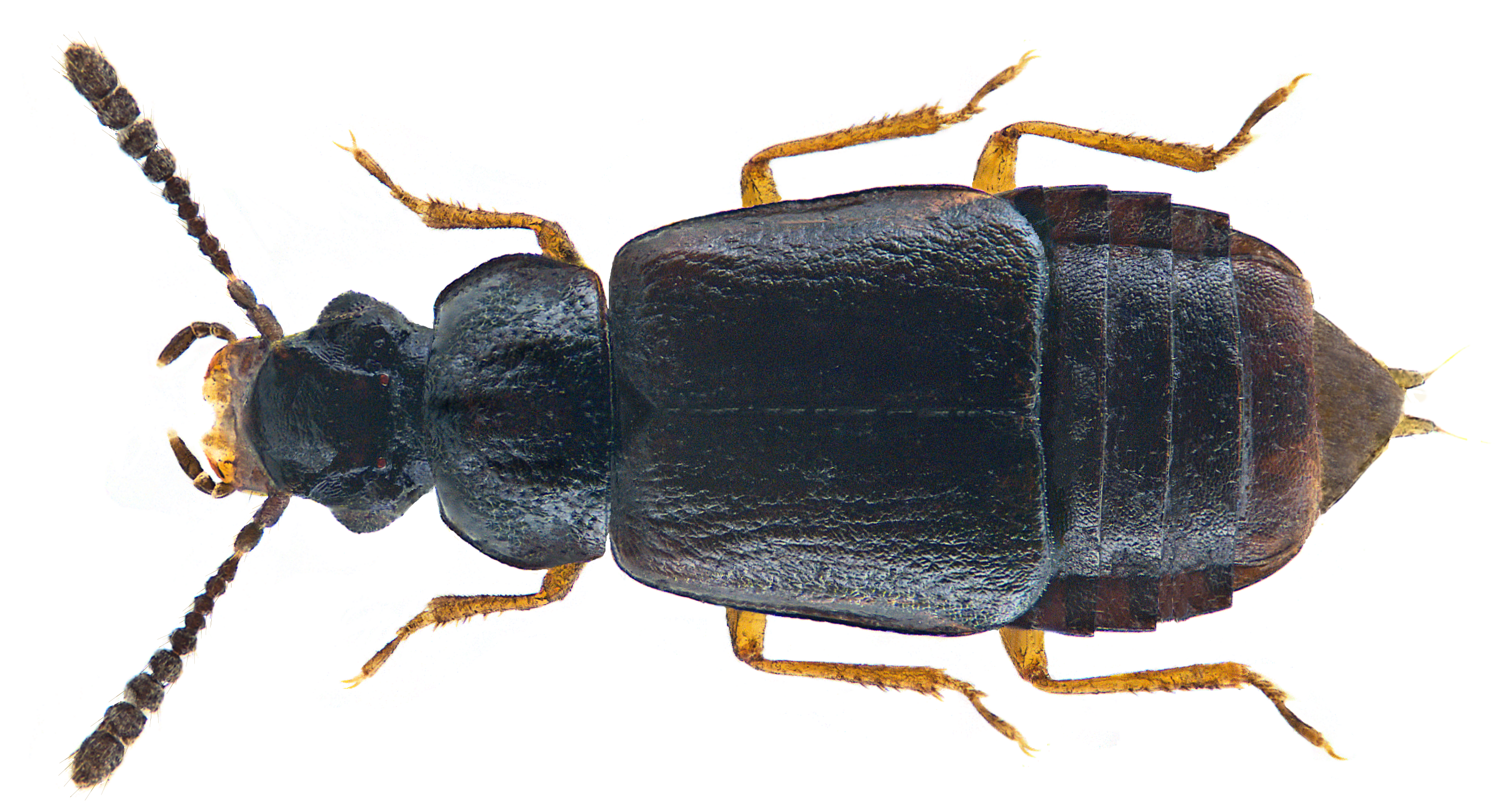
- Acrolocha

Scientific classification
- Kingdom: Animalia
- Phylum: Arthropoda
- Clade: Pancrustacea
- Class: Insecta
- Order: Coleoptera
- Suborder: Polyphaga
- Infraorder: Staphyliniformia
- Family: Staphylinidae
- Subfamily: Omaliinae
- Tribe: Omaliini; MacLeay, W. S., 1825

= Omaliini =

Tribe of beetles

Omaliini is a tribe of ocellate rove beetles in the family Staphylinidae. There are about 45 genera and 450 described species in Omaliini.

The Omaliini tribe is diverse in terms of morphology and biotopic preferences, and species within this tribe can be found in all zoogeographic regions of the world. Recent research has discovered new species of the genera Acrolocha and Paraphloeostiba in Nepal and southern China.

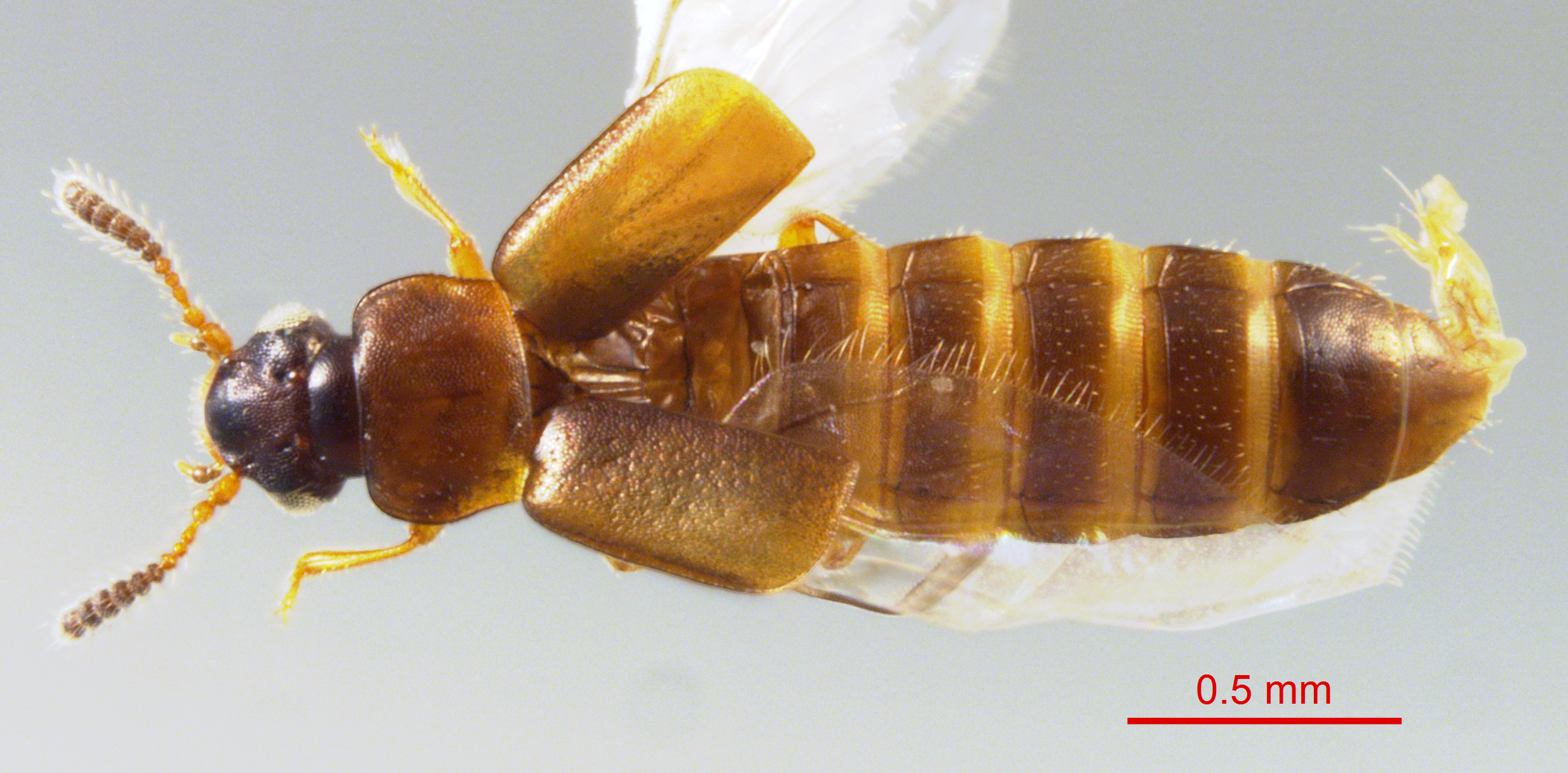
Phloeonomus laesicollis

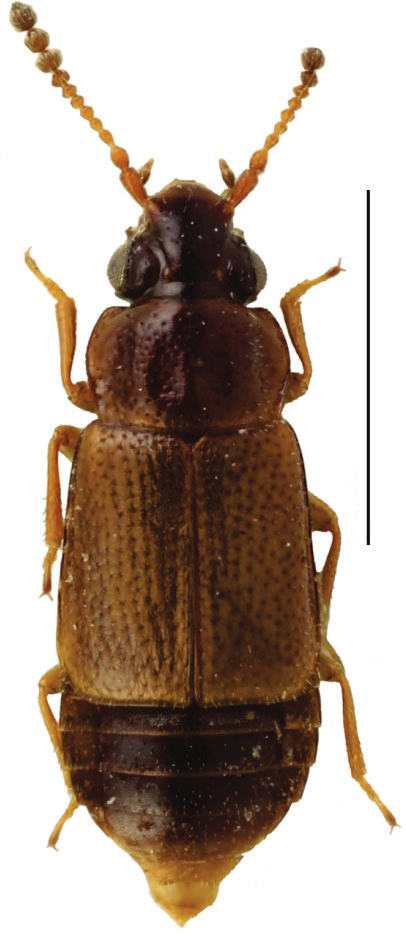
Carcinocephalus

== Genera ==
These 12 genera belong to the tribe Omaliini:

- Acrolocha Thomson, 1858^{g b}
- Acruliopsis Zerche, 2003^{b}
- Carcinocephalus Bernhauer, 1904^{g b}
- Dropephylla Mulsant & Rey, 1880^{g b}
- Hapalaraea Thomson, 1858^{g b}
- Micralymma Westwood, 1838^{g b}
- Omalium Gravenhorst, 1802^{c g b}
- Phloeonomus Heer, 1839^{g b}
- Phloeostiba Thomson, 1858^{c g b}
- Phyllodrepa Thomson, 1859^{g b}
- Pycnoglypta Thomson, 1858^{c g b}
- Xylodromus Heer, 1839^{c g b}

Data sources: i = ITIS, c = Catalogue of Life, g = GBIF, b = Bugguide.net
