= Perinthina =

Scientific classification
- Kingdom: Animalia
- Phylum: Arthropoda
- Class: Insecta
- Order: Coleoptera
- Suborder: Polyphaga
- Infraorder: Staphyliniformia
- Family: Staphylinidae
- Subfamily: Aleocharinae
- Tribe: Termitonannini
- Subtribe: Perinthina (Bernhauer & Scheerpeltz, 1926)

Genera
- Alzada (Kistner, 1999); Catalina (Pasteels, 1967); Eutermitophila (Cameron, 1939); Gralloperinthus (Kistner, 1973); Lauella (Mann, 1921); Macrognathellus (Silvestri, 1946); Paralauella (Kistner, 1972); Paraperinthus (Seevers, 1957); Perinthodes (Seevers, 1957); Perinthus (Casey, 1889); Physoperinthus (Pasteels & Kistner, 1970); Poduroides (Mann, 1926); Termitocola (Seevers, 1937); Termitonicus (Mann, 1926); Termitopelta (Borgmeier, 1950)

Synonyms
- Poduroideae (Scheerpeltz, 1934)

Subtribe of beetles

Perinthina is a subtribe of rove beetles in the subfamily Aleocharinae.
