= Dropephylla devillei =

Scientific classification
- Kingdom: Animalia
- Phylum: Arthropoda
- Clade: Pancrustacea
- Class: Insecta
- Order: Coleoptera
- Suborder: Polyphaga
- Infraorder: Staphyliniformia
- Family: Staphylinidae
- Genus: Dropephylla
- Species: D. devillei

Binomial name
- Dropephylla devillei (Bernhauer, 1902)

Synonyms
- Phyllodrepa devillei Bernhauer, 1902; Phyllodrepa grandiloqua Luze, 1910; Phyllodrepa propinqua Bernhauer, 1943

Species of beetle

Dropephylla devillei is a species of rove beetle in the subfamily Omaliinae. Its range extends from Turkey to the Faroe Islands and Madeira. A specimen collected in 2010 on Mount Meron was the first record of the species from Israel.
