= Dilacera =

- Dilacera monnei

Scientific classification
- Kingdom: Animalia
- Phylum: Arthropoda
- Clade: Pancrustacea
- Class: Insecta
- Order: Coleoptera
- Suborder: Polyphaga
- Infraorder: Staphyliniformia
- Family: Staphylinidae
- Tribe: Termitonannini
- Subtribe: Termitonannina
- Genus: Dilacera; Zilberman & Pires-Silva, 2022

Genus of beetles

Dilacera is a genus of beetles of the family Staphylinidae.

== Species ==
- Dilacera exokosmos Zilberman & Pires-Silva, 2022
- Dilacera monnei Zilberman & Moreno, 2026
