= Nordenskioldiini =

Scientific classification
- Kingdom: Animalia
- Phylum: Arthropoda
- Clade: Pancrustacea
- Class: Insecta
- Order: Coleoptera
- Suborder: Polyphaga
- Infraorder: Staphyliniformia
- Family: Staphylinidae
- Subfamily: Euaesthetinae
- Tribe: Nordenskioldiini; Bernhauer, 1911

Tribe of beetles

Nordenskioldiini is a tribe of rove beetles in the subfamily Euaesthetinae. It was first described in 1911 by Bernhauer and Schubert. It contains 27 accepted species split between two genera. To date, the majority of specimens observed have been fossils. Observations have been made in the United States, the Russian Federation, Lebanon, Nepal, Canada, Svalbard and Jan Mayen.

== Genera ==
- Edaphosoma
- Nordenskioldia
