= Euaesthetini =

Scientific classification
- Kingdom: Animalia
- Phylum: Arthropoda
- Clade: Pancrustacea
- Class: Insecta
- Order: Coleoptera
- Suborder: Polyphaga
- Infraorder: Staphyliniformia
- Family: Staphylinidae
- Subfamily: Euaesthetinae
- Tribe: Euaesthetini; Thomson, C. G., 1859

Tribe of beetles

Euaesthetini is a tribe of beetles belonging to the family Staphylinidae.

Genera:

- Ctenomastax Kraatz, 1870
- Edaphus Motschulsky, 1857
- Euaesthetotyphlus Coiffait & Decu, 1970
- Euaesthetus Gravenhorst, 1806
- Macroturellus Orousset, 1987
- Octavius Fauvel, 1873
- Protopristus Broun, 1909
- Schatzmayrina Koch, C., 1934
- Tamotus Schaufuss, L. W., 1872
