= Alzadaesthetus =

Scientific classification
- Kingdom: Animalia
- Phylum: Arthropoda
- Clade: Pancrustacea
- Class: Insecta
- Order: Coleoptera
- Suborder: Polyphaga
- Infraorder: Staphyliniformia
- Family: Staphylinidae
- Subfamily: Euaesthetinae
- Tribe: Alzadaesthetini; Scheerpeltz, 1974
- Genus: Alzadaesthetus; Kistner, 1961

Genus of insects

Alzadaesthetini is a tribe of rove beetles from the subfamily Euaesthetinae. It was first described in 1974 by Scheerpeltz. It contains one genus, Alzadaesthetus, with two accepted species.

== Species ==
- Alzadaesthetus chilensis
- Alzedaesthetus furcillatus
