= Stenaesthetini =

Scientific classification
- Kingdom: Animalia
- Phylum: Arthropoda
- Clade: Pancrustacea
- Class: Insecta
- Order: Coleoptera
- Suborder: Polyphaga
- Infraorder: Staphyliniformia
- Family: Staphylinidae
- Subfamily: Euaesthetinae
- Tribe: Stenaesthetini; Bernhauer, 1911

Tribe of beetles

Stenaesthetini is a tribe of rove beetles in the subfamily Euaesthetinae. It was first described in 1911 by Bernhauer and Schubert. It contains 147 accepted species, split between 3 genera. Observations of members of Stenaesthetini have been made in Nepal, Vietnam, Japan, New Zealand, French Guiana, Thailand, China, Taiwan, India, among several other countries.

== Genera ==
- Agnosthaetus
- Stenaesthetus
- Tyrannomastax
