= Catalina elegans =

Scientific classification
- Kingdom: Animalia
- Phylum: Arthropoda
- Class: Insecta
- Order: Coleoptera
- Suborder: Polyphaga
- Infraorder: Staphyliniformia
- Family: Staphylinidae
- Subfamily: Aleocharinae
- Tribe: Termitonannini
- Subtribe: Perinthina
- Genus: Catalina; Pasteels, 1967
- Species: C. elegans

Binomial name
- Catalina elegans Pasteels, 1967

Species of beetle

Catalina elegans is a species of rove beetles in the subfamily Aleocharinae. It has an Afrotropical distribution.
