= Dilacera monnei =

Scientific classification
- Kingdom: Animalia
- Phylum: Arthropoda
- Clade: Pancrustacea
- Class: Insecta
- Order: Coleoptera
- Suborder: Polyphaga
- Infraorder: Staphyliniformia
- Family: Staphylinidae
- Genus: Dilacera
- Species: D. monnei

Binomial name
- Dilacera monnei Zilberman & Moreno, 2026

Species of beetle

Dilacera monnei is a species of beetle of the family Staphylinidae. It is found in Brazil (Pará).

== Description ==
Adults reach a length of about 4.4 mm (0.17 in). The head and pronotum are dark brown, the former with a row of four macrosetae on the dorsal margin delimitating each eye. The pronotum is wider than long. There are rows of bristles on the sternites which are overall uniformly black across all abdomen without losing pigmentation.

== Life history ==
They are thought to be termitophile, because of the taxonomic position where closely related taxa are known to be associated with termites. Furthermore, the overall body shape shows termitomodification (meaning that the species has developed morphological modification for living within termites).

== Etymology ==
The species is named in honour of Miguel A. Monné.
