= Xylodromus uralensis =

Scientific classification
- Kingdom: Animalia
- Phylum: Arthropoda
- Class: Insecta
- Order: Coleoptera
- Suborder: Polyphaga
- Infraorder: Staphyliniformia
- Family: Staphylinidae
- Genus: Xylodromus
- Species: X. uralensis

Binomial name
- Xylodromus uralensis Kirshenblat, 1936

Species of beetle

Xylodromus uralensis is a species of beetle in the rove beetle family that is endemic to Russia.
