= Dropephylla elegans =

Scientific classification
- Kingdom: Animalia
- Phylum: Arthropoda
- Class: Insecta
- Order: Coleoptera
- Suborder: Polyphaga
- Infraorder: Staphyliniformia
- Family: Staphylinidae
- Genus: Dropephylla
- Species: D. elegans

Binomial name
- Dropephylla elegans (Kraatz, 1857)

Synonyms
- Hapalaraea elegans (Kraatz, 1858); Phyllodrepa elegans (Kraatz, 1857)

Species of beetle

Dropephylla elegans is a species of rove beetles found in Europe.
