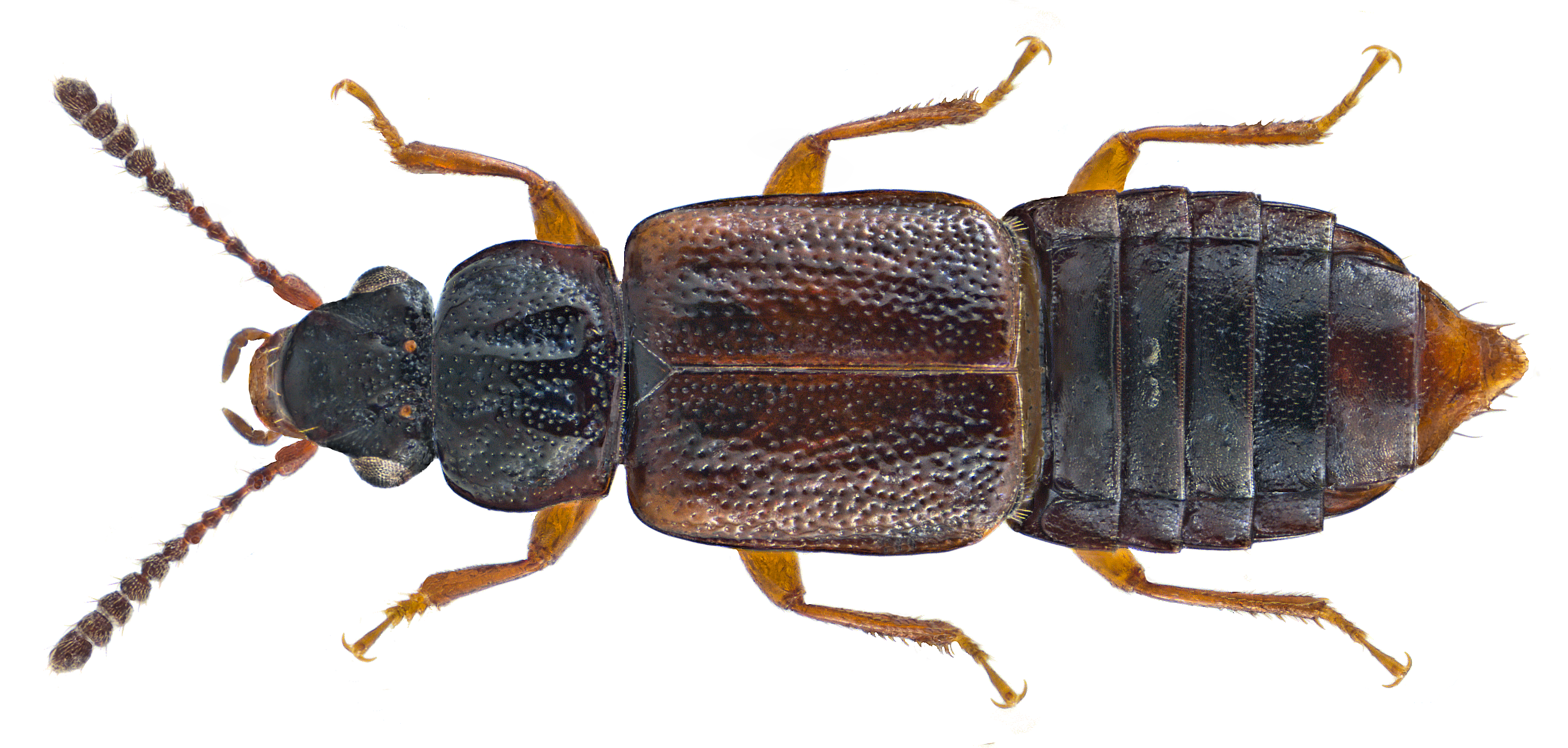

Scientific classification
- Kingdom: Animalia
- Phylum: Arthropoda
- Clade: Pancrustacea
- Class: Insecta
- Order: Coleoptera
- Suborder: Polyphaga
- Infraorder: Staphyliniformia
- Family: Staphylinidae
- Genus: Omalium
- Species: O. rivulare

Binomial name
- Omalium rivulare (Paykull, 1789)

= Omalium rivulare =

Species of beetle

Omalium rivulare is a species of ocellate rove beetle in the family Staphylinidae.
