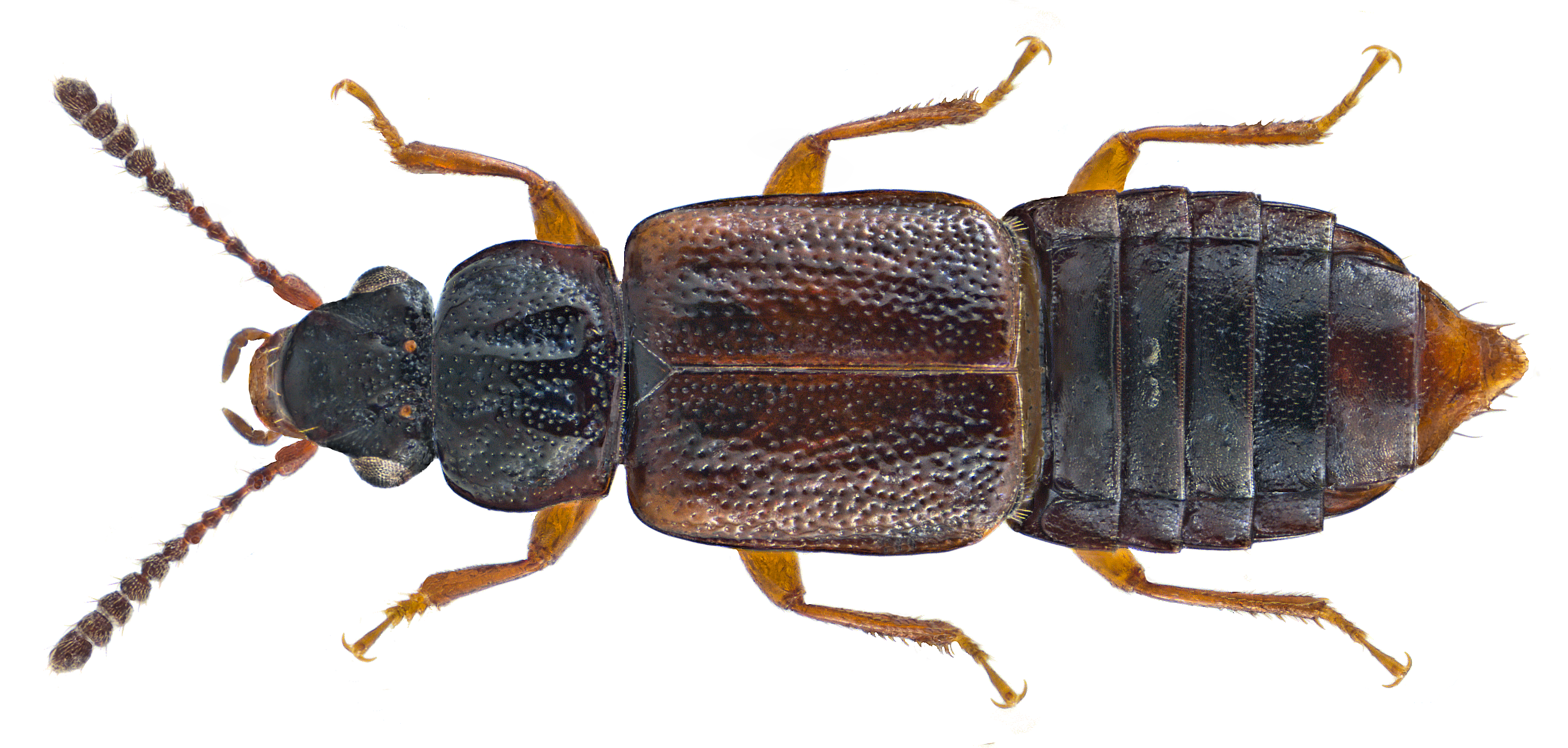
- Omalium rivulare

Scientific classification
- Kingdom: Animalia
- Phylum: Arthropoda
- Clade: Pancrustacea
- Class: Insecta
- Order: Coleoptera
- Suborder: Polyphaga
- Infraorder: Staphyliniformia
- Family: Staphylinidae
- Subfamily: Omaliinae
- Tribe: Omaliini
- Genus: Omalium; Gravenhorst, 1802

= Omalium =

Genus of beetles

Omalium is a genus of ocellate rove beetles in the family Staphylinidae. There are at least 70 described species in Omalium.

== Species ==
These 74 species belong to the genus Omalium:

- Omalium algarum Casey, 1885^{g}
- Omalium allardii Fairmaire & Brisout de Barneville, 1859^{g}
- Omalium amicale Gistel, 1857^{g}
- Omalium asturicum Fauvel, 1900^{g}
- Omalium atrum Heer, 1839^{g}
- Omalium blattoides Guérin-Méneville, 1829^{g}
- Omalium brevipenne Motschulsky, 1860^{g}
- Omalium bulgaricum Zerche, 1988^{g}
- Omalium caesum Gravenhorst, 1806^{g}
- Omalium cantabricum Coiffait, 1966^{g}
- Omalium cerrutii Zanetti, 1985^{g}
- Omalium chinese Li & Chen, 1993^{c g}
- Omalium cinnamomeum Kraatz, 1857^{g}
- Omalium collare Lentz, 1856^{g}
- Omalium crassicorne Lea, 1906^{g}
- Omalium cribrum^{b}
- Omalium cursor Gravenhorst, 1806^{g}
- Omalium denticolle Sharp, 1889^{g}
- Omalium deubeli Bernhauer, 1915^{g}
- Omalium doderoi Zanetti, 1980^{g}
- Omalium escayraci Saulcy, 1864^{g}
- Omalium espanoli Jarrige, 1952^{g}
- Omalium excavatum Stephens, 1834^{g}
- Omalium exiguum Gyllenhal, 1810^{g}
- Omalium ferrugineum Kraatz, 1857^{g}
- Omalium foraminosum Méklin, 1852^{g}
- Omalium fractum^{b}
- Omalium funebre Fauvel, 1871^{g}
- Omalium fuscum Stephens, 1834^{g}
- Omalium henroti Coiffait, 1976^{g}
- Omalium hilare Gistel, 1857^{g}
- Omalium holtzi Bernhauer, 1943^{g}
- Omalium hypsibioticum Gistel, 1857^{g}
- Omalium imhoffii Heer, 1839^{g}
- Omalium imitator Luze, 1906^{g}
- Omalium italicum Bernhauer, 1902^{g}
- Omalium laeviusculum Gyllenhal, 1827^{g}
- Omalium laticolle Kraatz, 1857^{g}
- Omalium latum Stephens, 1834^{g}
- Omalium littorale Kraatz, 1858^{g}
- Omalium lokayi Fleischer, 1897^{g}
- Omalium longicorne Luze, 1906^{c g}
- Omalium marginatum Say, 1832^{g}
- Omalium mesomelas Holme, 1842^{g}
- Omalium monticulum Grimmer, 1841^{g}
- Omalium muensteri Bernhauer, 1900^{g}
- Omalium nigriceps Kiesenwetter, 1850^{g}
- Omalium nigrum Gravenhorst, 1806^{g}
- Omalium ocellatum Wollaston, 1854^{g}
- Omalium oxyacanthae Gravenhorst, 1806^{c g}
- Omalium plagiatum Mannerheim, 1843^{g}
- Omalium poggii Zanetti, 1985^{g}
- Omalium punicantipenne Grimmer, 1841^{g}
- Omalium pygmaeum Gravenhorst, 1806^{g}
- Omalium quadripenne Casey, 1893^{g}
- Omalium repandum Erichson, 1840^{g b}
- Omalium riparium Thomson, 1857^{g}
- Omalium rivulare (Paykull, 1789)^{g b}
- Omalium robustum Broun, 1911^{g}
- Omalium rufum Sachse, 1852^{g}
- Omalium rugatum Mulsant & Rey, 1880^{g}
- Omalium rugulipenne Rye, 1864^{g}
- Omalium saulcyi Fauvel, 1875^{g}
- Omalium scabrum Smetana, 1975^{c g}
- Omalium sculpticolle Wollaston, 1864^{g}
- Omalium septentrionis Thomson, 1857^{g}
- Omalium sorbi Gyllenhal, 1810^{g}
- Omalium striatum Gravenhorst, 1802^{g}
- Omalium strigicolle Wankowicz, 1869^{c g}
- Omalium subrugosum Stephens, 1834^{g}
- Omalium subsolanum Herman, 2001^{c g}
- Omalium testaceum Gravenhorst, 1806^{g}
- Omalium validum Kraatz, 1858^{g}
- Omalium xambeui Fauvel, 1876^{g}

Data sources: i = ITIS, c = Catalogue of Life, g = GBIF, b = Bugguide.net
