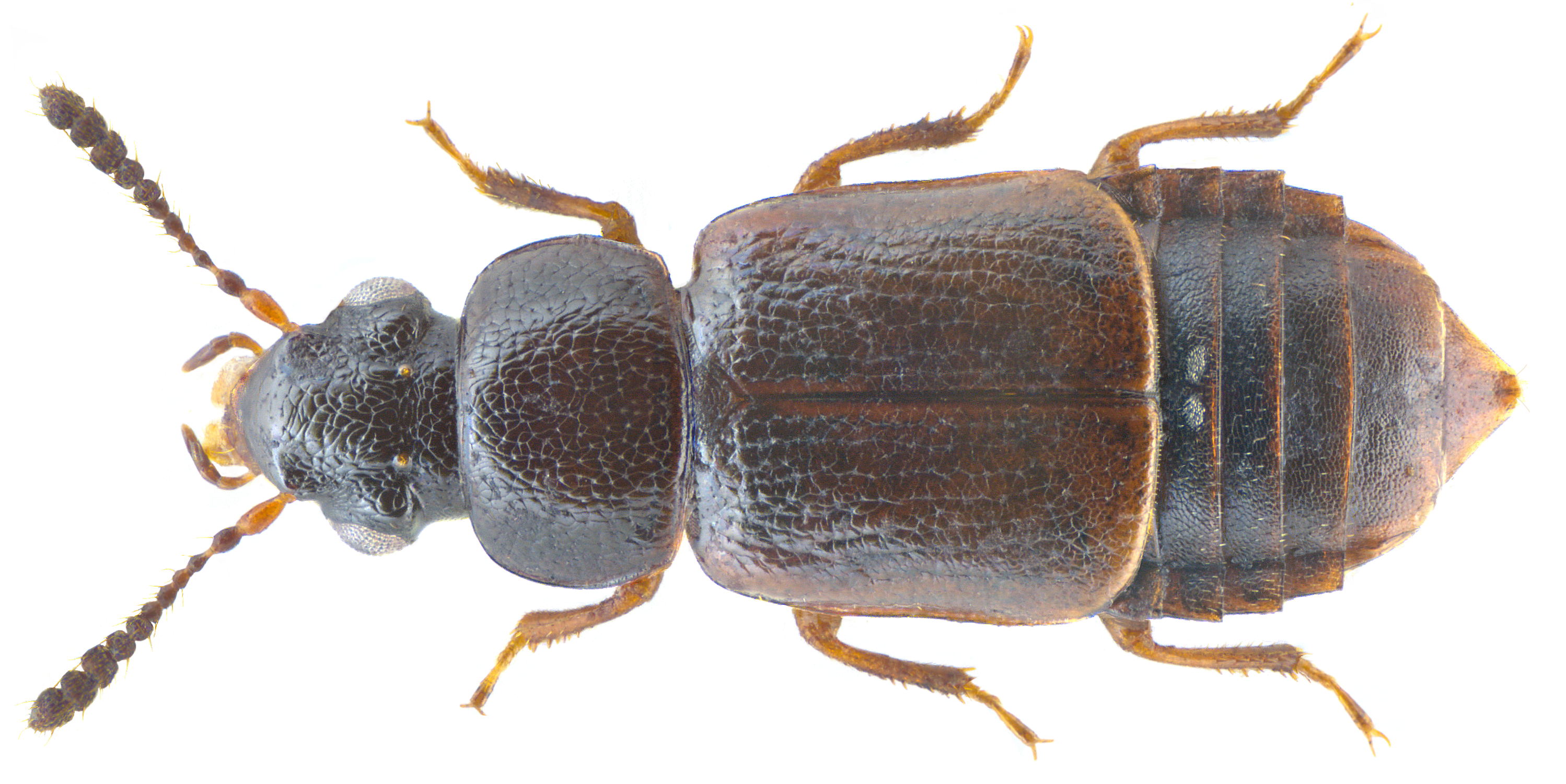

Scientific classification
- Domain: Eukaryota
- Kingdom: Animalia
- Phylum: Arthropoda
- Class: Insecta
- Order: Coleoptera
- Suborder: Polyphaga
- Infraorder: Staphyliniformia
- Family: Staphylinidae
- Tribe: Omaliini
- Genus: Acrolocha; Thomson, 1858

= Acrolocha =

Genus of beetles

Acrolocha is a genus of beetles belonging to the family Staphylinidae.

The genus was described in 1858 by Carl Gustaf Thomson.

he species of this genus are found in Eurasia and North America.

Species:

- Acrolocha amabilis (Heer, 1841)
- Acrolocha caucasica Tóth, 1976
- Acrolocha daccordii Zanetti, 1979
- Acrolocha diffusa (Fauvel, 1878)
- Acrolocha helferi Steel, 1957
- Acrolocha horiguchii Y.Watanabe, 2007
- Acrolocha iranica Assing, 2022
- Acrolocha kanagawana Y.Watanabe, 2007
- Acrolocha leechi Hatch, 1957
- Acrolocha minuta (Olivier & A.G., 1795)
- Acrolocha miyamorii Y.Watanabe, 1990
- Acrolocha newtoni Thayer, 2003
- Acrolocha pliginskii Bernhauer, 1912
- Acrolocha rogeri Shavrin, 2017
- Acrolocha sulcula (Stephens, 1834)
- Acrolocha wahuiensis Zhong, Miao, Mei-Jun Zhao & Li-Zhen Li, 2009
- Acrolocha zhongdianensis Shavrin & Smetana, 2016
