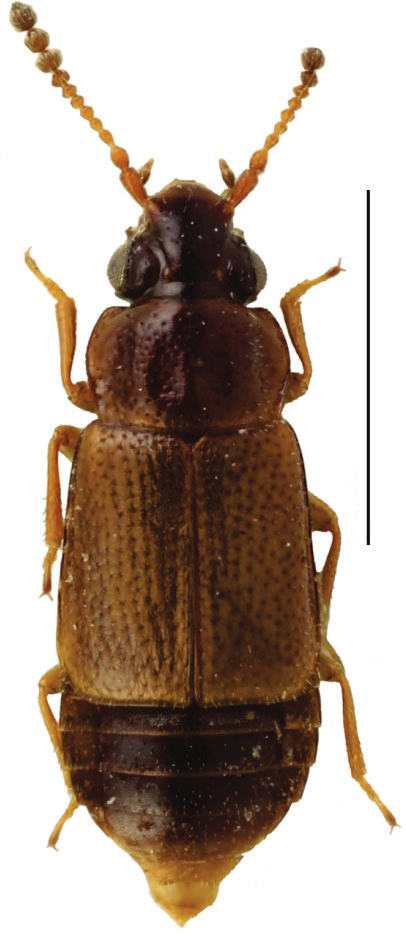
- Carcinocephalus szujeckii

Scientific classification
- Domain: Eukaryota
- Kingdom: Animalia
- Phylum: Arthropoda
- Class: Insecta
- Order: Coleoptera
- Suborder: Polyphaga
- Infraorder: Staphyliniformia
- Family: Staphylinidae
- Subfamily: Omaliinae
- Tribe: Omaliini
- Genus: Carcinocephalus; Bernhauer, 1903

= Carcinocephalus =

Genus of beetles

Carcinocephalus is a genus of rove beetles in the family Staphylinidae, subfamily Omaliinae.

== Species ==
There are about 7 species described in Carcinocephalus:

- Carcinocephalus blandus (Luze, 1906) - Italy
- Carcinocephalus cuccodoroi (Shavrin, 2022) - India (Assam)
- Carcinocephalus exsculpta (Méklin, 1852)
- Carcinocephalus flavidus (Hamilton, 1895) - Canada (AB, ON, QC), USA (DC, MA, MD, ME, NH, NY, PA, VA)
- Carcinocephalus merkli (Eppelsheim, 1883) - Bosnia-Herzegovina, Bulgaria, Greece, Macedonia, Romania, Serbia
- Carcinocephalus satoi (Hayashi, Y., 2008) - Japan (Honshu)
- Carcinocephalus szujeckii (Shavrin, 2019) - Taiwan
