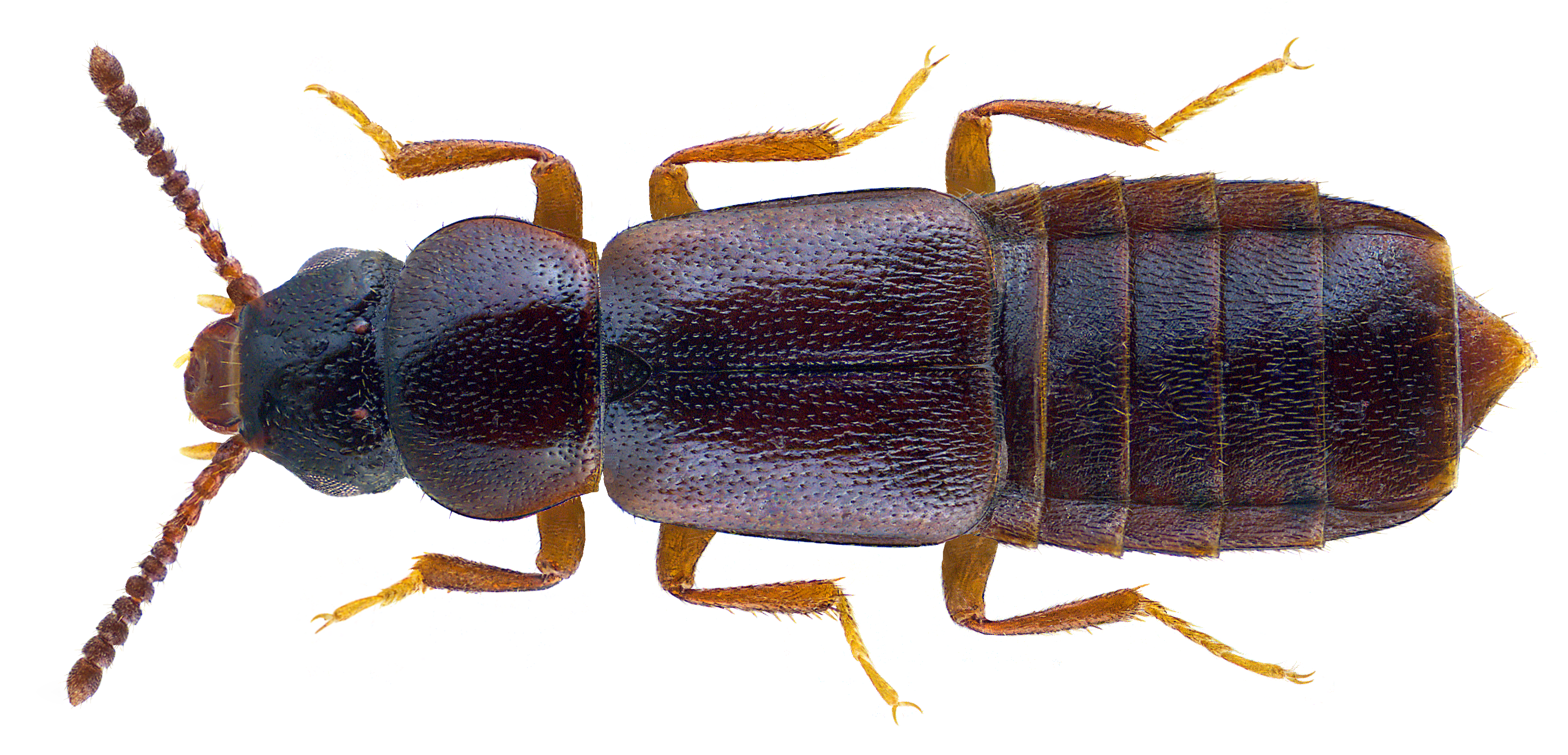

Scientific classification
- Kingdom: Animalia
- Phylum: Arthropoda
- Class: Insecta
- Order: Coleoptera
- Suborder: Polyphaga
- Infraorder: Staphyliniformia
- Family: Staphylinidae
- Genus: Xylodromus
- Species: X. concinnus

Binomial name
- Xylodromus concinnus (Marsham, 1802)

Synonyms
- Staphylinus concinnus Marsham, 1802; Omalium brunnipennis Stephens, 1834; Omalium brunnipes Stephens, 1834; Omalissus castaneus Broun, 1893; Omalium lacustris Casey, 1893; Omalium picinus Stephens, 1834; Omalissus scutosus Broun, 1915; Omalium ater Gerhardt, 1901; Xylodromus fuliginosus Heer, 1839

= Xylodromus concinnus =

Species of beetle

Xylodromus concinnus is a species of rove beetle in the Omaliinae subfamily, that can be found everywhere in Europe, the Near East, and Australia.
