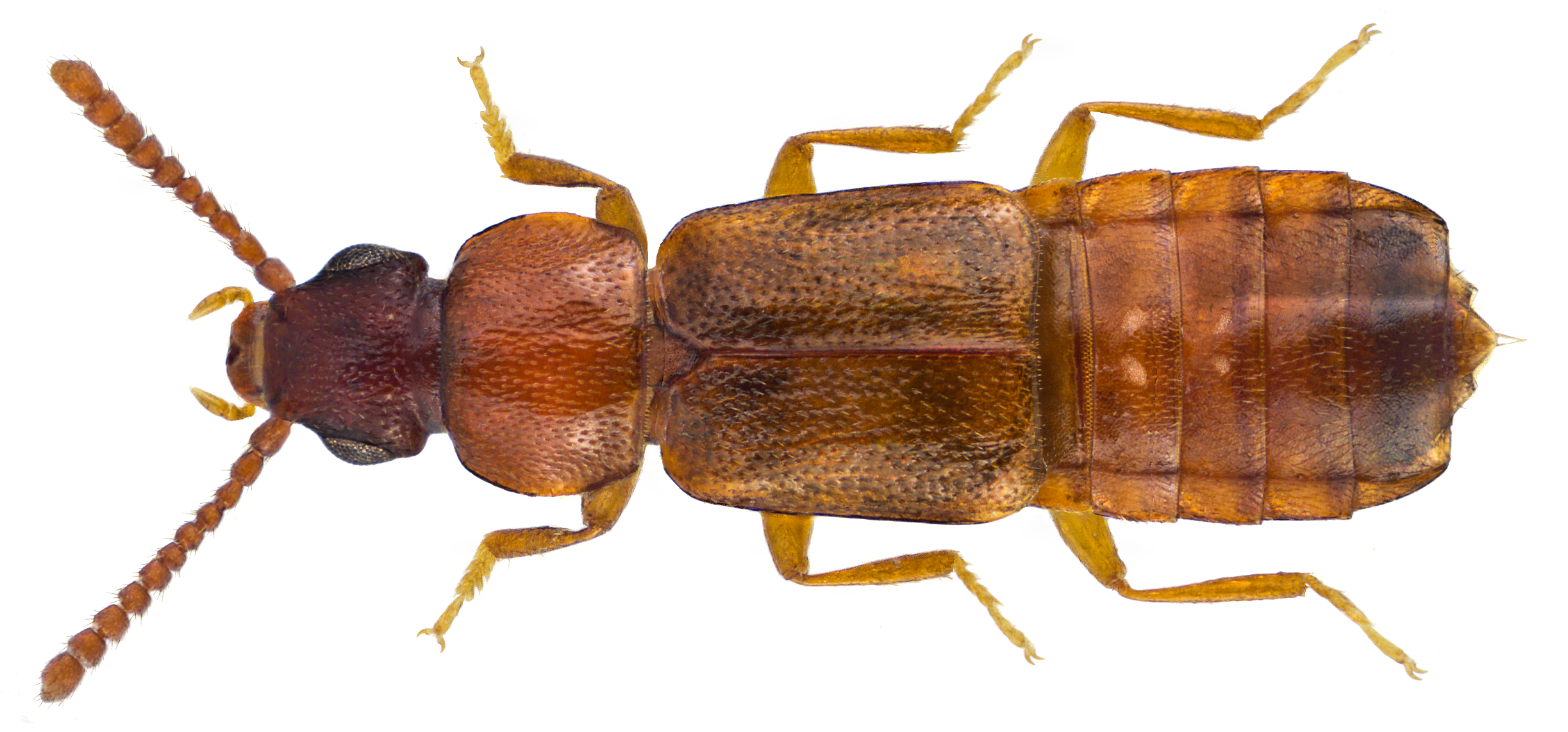

Scientific classification
- Kingdom: Animalia
- Phylum: Arthropoda
- Class: Insecta
- Order: Coleoptera
- Suborder: Polyphaga
- Infraorder: Staphyliniformia
- Family: Staphylinidae
- Genus: Xylodromus
- Species: X. testaceus

Binomial name
- Xylodromus testaceus (Erichson, 1840)

Synonyms
- Homalium testaceum Erichson; Omalium pygmaeus Fiori, 1900; Phyllodrepa heterocerus Gravenhorst, 1806

= Xylodromus testaceus =

Species of beetle

Xylodromus testaceus is a species of brownish coloured rove beetle in the Omaliinae subfamily that can be found in Austria, Belgium, Czech Republic, Denmark, France, Germany, Hungary, Italy, Poland, Romania, Russia, Slovakia, Spain, Sweden, the Netherlands, Ukraine, and all of the republics of former Yugoslavia (except for Slovenia). It can also be found in the Near East.
