= Austroesthetini =

Scientific classification
- Kingdom: Animalia
- Phylum: Arthropoda
- Clade: Pancrustacea
- Class: Insecta
- Order: Coleoptera
- Suborder: Polyphaga
- Infraorder: Staphyliniformia
- Family: Staphylinidae
- Subfamily: Euaesthetinae
- Tribe: Austroesthetini; Cameron, 1944

Austroesthetini is a tribe of rove beetles in the subfamily Euaesthetinae. It was first described in 1944 by Cameron. It contains 30 accepted species split between six genera. Observations of Austroesthetini members have been made in Chile, New Zealand, and Australia.

== Genera ==
- Austroesthetus
- Chilioesthetus
- Kiwiaesthetus
- Mesoaesthetus
- Nothoesthetus
- Tasmanosthetus
