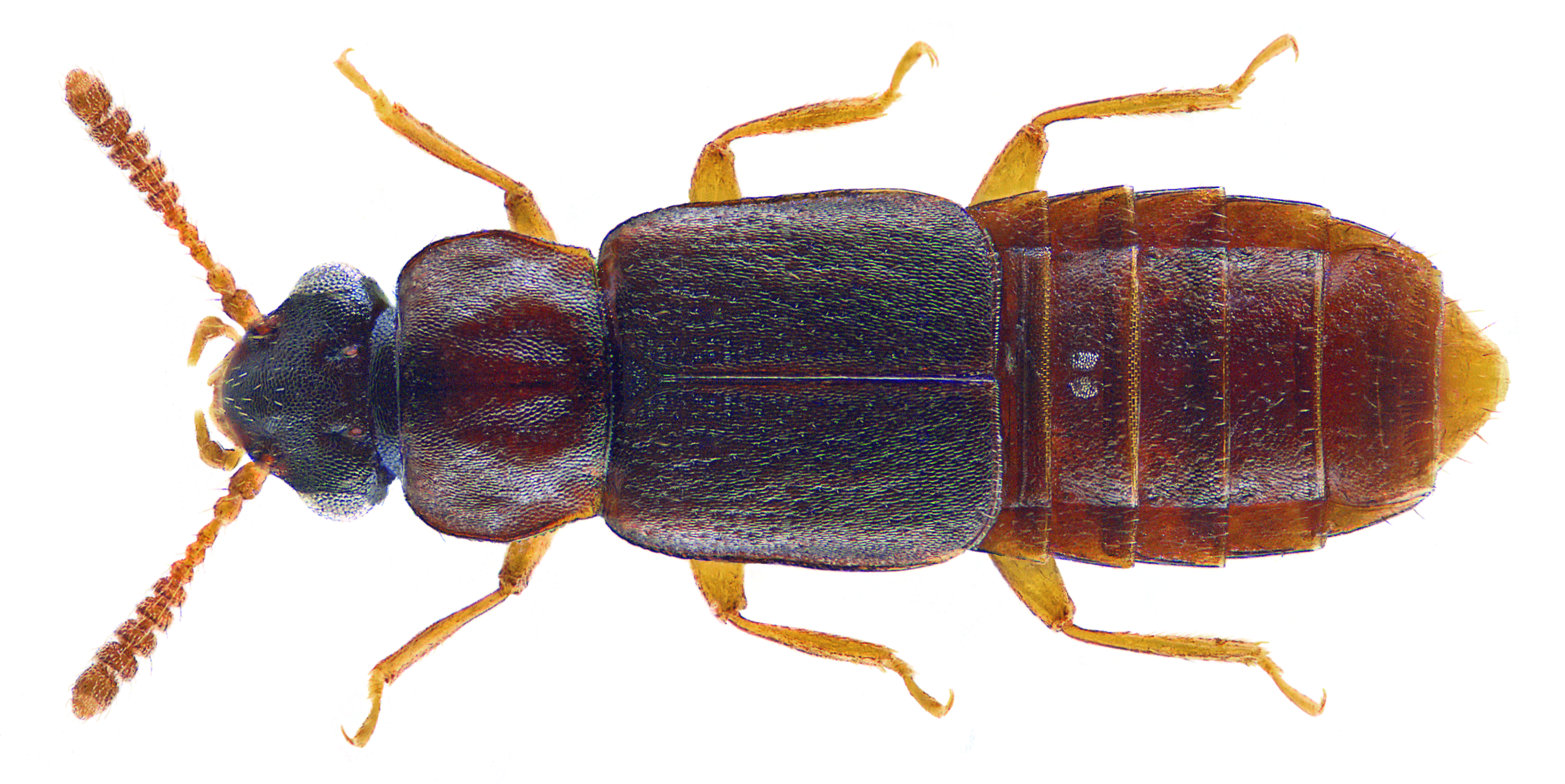
- Phloeonomus punctipennis 1,9 mm (1,7 to 2,0 mm)

Scientific classification
- Kingdom: Animalia
- Phylum: Arthropoda
- Clade: Pancrustacea
- Class: Insecta
- Order: Coleoptera
- Suborder: Polyphaga
- Infraorder: Staphyliniformia
- Family: Staphylinidae
- Genus: Phloeonomus
- Species: P. punctipennis

Binomial name
- Phloeonomus punctipennis Thomson, 1867

= Phloeonomus punctipennis =

Species of beetle

Phloeonomus punctipennis is a species of rove beetle native to Europe.
