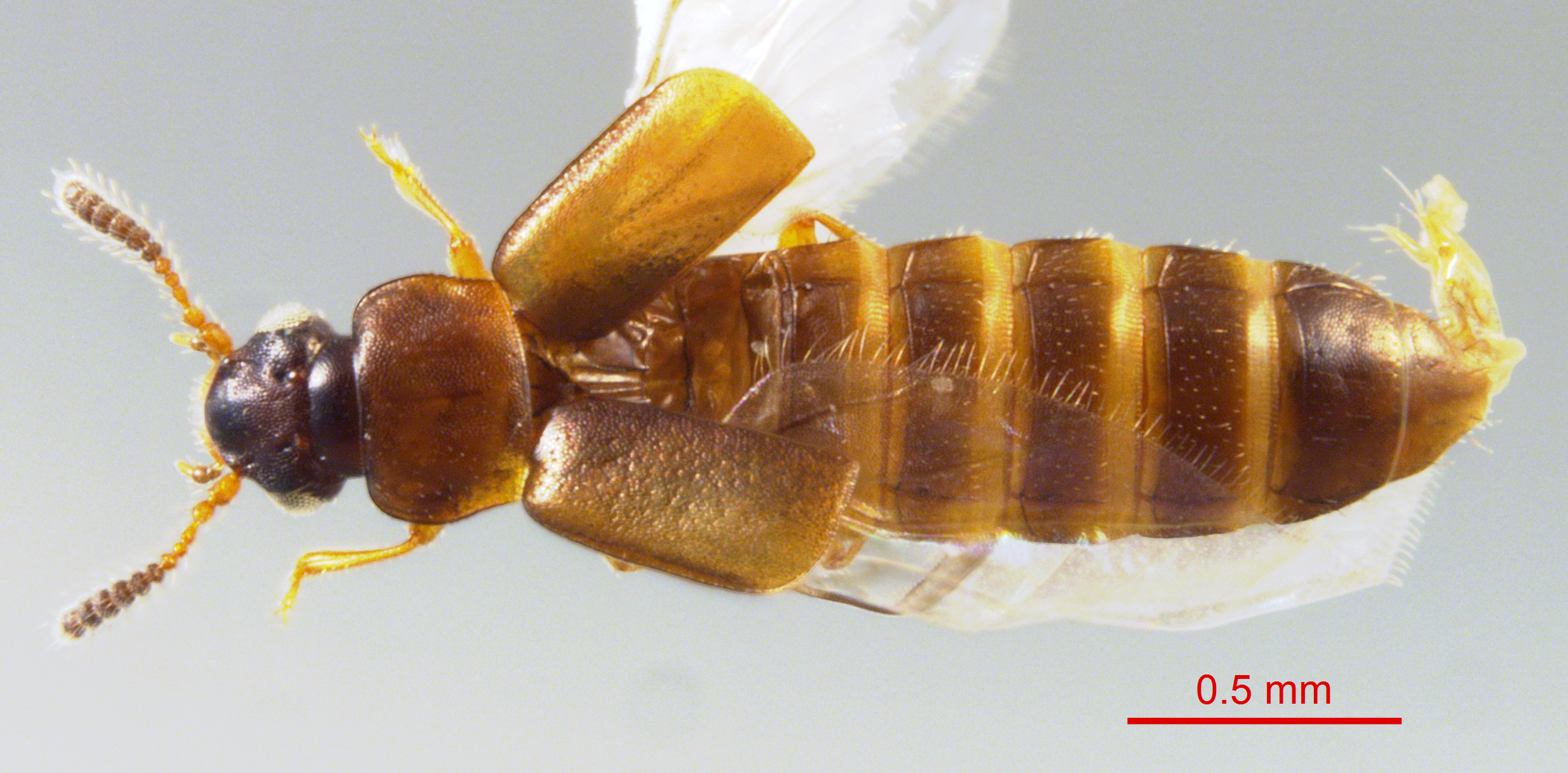
- Phloeonomus laesicollis

Scientific classification
- Domain: Eukaryota
- Kingdom: Animalia
- Phylum: Arthropoda
- Class: Insecta
- Order: Coleoptera
- Suborder: Polyphaga
- Infraorder: Staphyliniformia
- Family: Staphylinidae
- Subfamily: Omaliinae
- Tribe: Omaliini
- Genus: Phloeonomus; Heer, 1839

= Phloeonomus =

Genus of beetles

Phloeonomus is a genus of ocellate rove beetles in the family Staphylinidae. There are about eight described species in Phloeonomus.

== Species ==
These eight species belong to the genus Phloeonomus:

- Phloeonomus flavipennis (Méklin, 1853)^{g}
- Phloeonomus laesicollis (Maklin, 1852)^{g b}
- Phloeonomus minimus (Erichson, 1839)^{g}
- Phloeonomus pedicularius (Erichson, 1840)^{g}
- Phloeonomus punctipennis Thomson, 1867^{g}
- Phloeonomus pusillus (Gravenhorst, 1806)^{g}
- Phloeonomus sjobergi Strand, 1937^{g}
- Phloeonomus suffusus (Casey, 1894)^{b}

Data sources: i = ITIS, c = Catalogue of Life, g = GBIF, b = Bugguide.net
