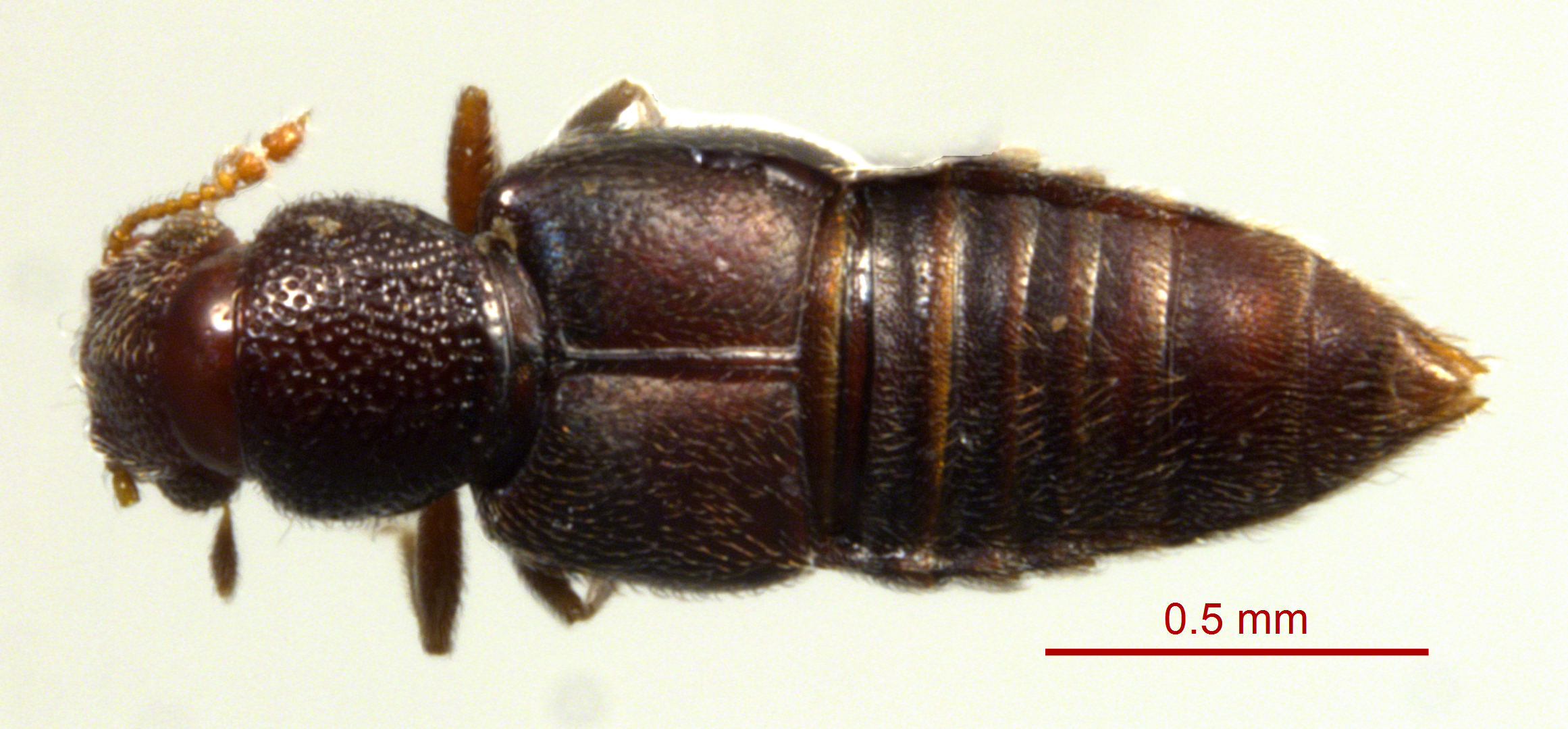
- Euaesthetus

Scientific classification
- Domain: Eukaryota
- Kingdom: Animalia
- Phylum: Arthropoda
- Class: Insecta
- Order: Coleoptera
- Suborder: Polyphaga
- Infraorder: Staphyliniformia
- Family: Staphylinidae
- Subfamily: Euaesthetinae
- Genus: Euaesthetus; Gravenhorst, 1806

Extant species
- See text

= Euaesthetus =

Genus of beetles

Euaesthetus is a genus of beetles belonging to the family Staphylinidae.

The genus was first described by Johann Ludwig Christian Gravenhorst in 1806.

The genus has cosmopolitan distribution.

Species:

- Euaesthetus bipunctatus
- Euaesthetus laeviusculus
- Euaesthetus ruficapillus
