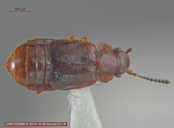
- Acruliopsis tumidula

Scientific classification
- Domain: Eukaryota
- Kingdom: Animalia
- Phylum: Arthropoda
- Class: Insecta
- Order: Coleoptera
- Suborder: Polyphaga
- Infraorder: Staphyliniformia
- Family: Staphylinidae
- Tribe: Omaliini
- Genus: Acruliopsis; Zerche, 2003

= Acruliopsis =

Genus of beetles

Acruliopsis is a genus of rove beetles in the family Staphylinidae, subfamily Omaliinae.

== Species ==
There are about 5 species described in Acruliopsis:

- Acruliopsis denticollis (Sharp, 1889) - Japan (Hokkaido, Honshu, Kyushu, Shikoku)
- Acruliopsis nipponica (Watanabe, Y., 1980) - Japan (Hokkaido, Honshu)
- Acruliopsis tumidula (Mäklin, 1853) - BC AK OR WA
- Acruliopsis ussuriensis (Zerche, 2003) - Russia (Far East), Korea (S)
- Acruliopsis watanabei (Zerche, 2003) - Japan (Honshu)
