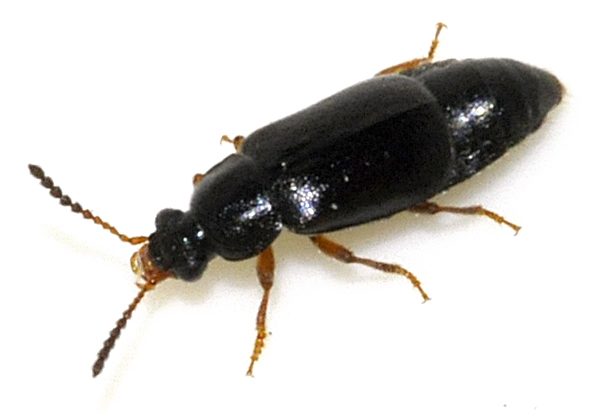
- Phyllodrepa, species undetermined. Body length 3.3 mm without antennae.

Scientific classification
- Kingdom: Animalia
- Phylum: Arthropoda
- Class: Insecta
- Order: Coleoptera
- Suborder: Polyphaga
- Infraorder: Staphyliniformia
- Family: Staphylinidae
- Subfamily: Omaliinae
- Tribe: Omaliini
- Genus: Phyllodrepa; Thomson, 1859

= Phyllodrepa =

Genus of beetles

Phyllodrepa is a genus of beetles belonging to the family Staphylinidae.

The species of this genus are found in Europe and northern America.

Species:

- Phyllodrepa alutacea (Fauvel, 1878)
- Phyllodrepa angelinii Zanetti, 2012
- Phyllodrepa angustata (Mäklin, 1878)
- Phyllodrepa antiqua Zanetti, Perreau & Solodovnikov, 2016
- Phyllodrepa atra Casey, 1893
- Phyllodrepa baicalensis (Bernhauer, 1903)
- Phyllodrepa bolsonensis Scheerpeltz, 1972
- Phyllodrepa bonariensis Bernhauer, 1912
- Phyllodrepa brunnipennis (Stephens, 1834)
- Phyllodrepa caseyi Bernhauer & K.Schubert, 1910
- Phyllodrepa cribripennis (Fauvel, 1878)
- Phyllodrepa daedali Shavrin & Yamamoto, 2019
- Phyllodrepa devillei Bernhauer, 1902
- Phyllodrepa flavipennis (Mäklin, 1853)
- Phyllodrepa floralis (Paykull, 1789)
- Phyllodrepa graeca Bernhauer, 1929
- Phyllodrepa hispanica Bernhauer, 1929
- Phyllodrepa humerosa (Fauvel, 1878)
- Phyllodrepa humilis (Mäklin, 1853)
- Phyllodrepa icari Shavrin & Yamamoto, 2019
- Phyllodrepa lestevoides (K.Sawada, 1966)
- Phyllodrepa linderi Scheerpeltz, 1966
- Phyllodrepa melanocephala (Fabricius, 1787)
- Phyllodrepa melis V.Hansen, 1940
- Phyllodrepa nigra (Gravenhorst, 1806)
- Phyllodrepa perforata Bernhauer & Schubert, 1910
- Phyllodrepa peruviana Bernhauer, 1941
- Phyllodrepa polaris J.Sahlberg, 1897
- Phyllodrepa puberula Bernhauer, 1903
- Phyllodrepa punctiventris (Fauvel, 1878)
- Phyllodrepa rufipennis Luze, 1906
- Phyllodrepa sahlbergi Luze, 1906
- Phyllodrepa salicis (Gyllenhal, 1810)
- Phyllodrepa strigipennis (Mäklin, 1852)
- Phyllodrepa turanica (Solsky, 1874)
