= Xylodromus fleischeri =

Scientific classification
- Kingdom: Animalia
- Phylum: Arthropoda
- Class: Insecta
- Order: Coleoptera
- Suborder: Polyphaga
- Infraorder: Staphyliniformia
- Family: Staphylinidae
- Genus: Xylodromus
- Species: X. fleischeri

Binomial name
- Xylodromus fleischeri Lokay, 1917

Species of beetle

Xylodromus fleischeri is a species of rove beetle in the Omaliinae subfamily that is endemic to Romania.

The species is named after Antonin Fleischer.
