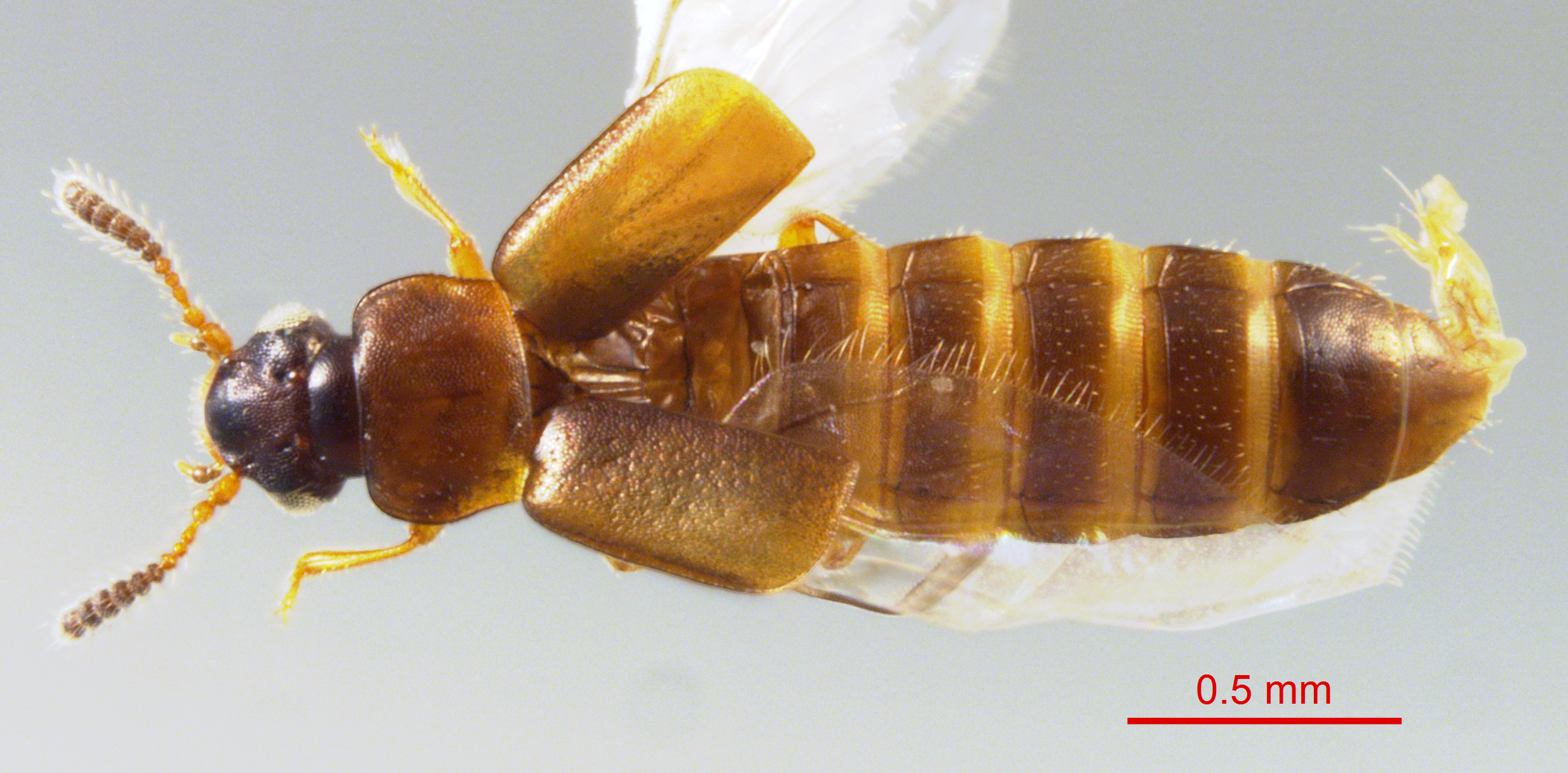

Scientific classification
- Domain: Eukaryota
- Kingdom: Animalia
- Phylum: Arthropoda
- Class: Insecta
- Order: Coleoptera
- Suborder: Polyphaga
- Infraorder: Staphyliniformia
- Family: Staphylinidae
- Genus: Phloeonomus
- Species: P. laesicollis

Binomial name
- Phloeonomus laesicollis (Maklin, 1852)

= Phloeonomus laesicollis =

Species of beetle

Phloeonomus laesicollis is a species of ocellate rove beetle in the family Staphylinidae.
