= Termitonannina =

Scientific classification
- Kingdom: Animalia
- Phylum: Arthropoda
- Clade: Pancrustacea
- Class: Insecta
- Order: Coleoptera
- Suborder: Polyphaga
- Infraorder: Staphyliniformia
- Family: Staphylinidae
- Subfamily: Aleocharinae
- Tribe: Termitonannini
- Subtribe: Termitonannina; Fenyes, 1918

Termitonannina is a subtribe of rove beetles in the tribe Termitonannini and the family Aleocharinae. It was first described in 1918 by Fenyes. It contains 27 species split across 9 genera. Thus far, all documented observations of members of Termitonannina have been in Brazil.

== Genera ==
- Chaetonannus
- Dilacera
- Eunannodes
- Macrotrichurus
- Nannellus
- Nannusa
- Termitocomes
- Termitonannus
- Termitonilla
