= Dropephylla =

Scientific classification
- Kingdom: Animalia
- Phylum: Arthropoda
- Class: Insecta
- Order: Coleoptera
- Suborder: Polyphaga
- Infraorder: Staphyliniformia
- Family: Staphylinidae
- Tribe: Omaliini
- Genus: Dropephylla; Mulsant & Rey, 1880

Type species
- Omalium lucidum Erichson, 1839 (= Omalium iopterum Stephens, 1834)

Species
- Dropephylla elegans (Kraatz, 1857); Dropephylla grandiloqua; Dropephylla devillei Bernhauer, 1902; Dropephylla gracilicornis (Fairmaire & Laboulbène, 1856); Dropephylla heerii (Heer, 1841); Dropephylla ioptera

Genus of beetles

Dropephylla is a genus of rove beetles.
