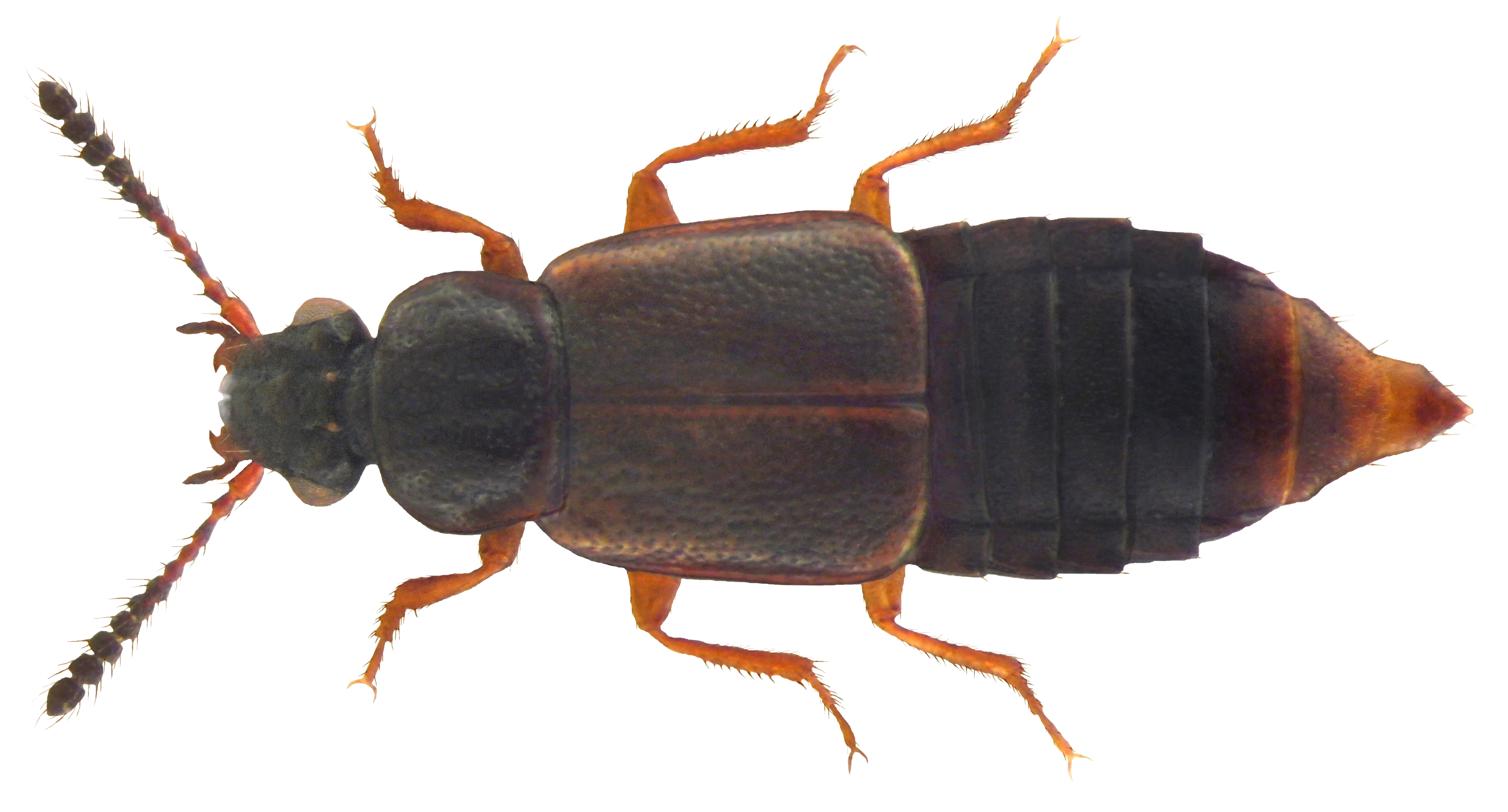
- Omalium rugatum

Scientific classification
- Domain: Eukaryota
- Kingdom: Animalia
- Phylum: Arthropoda
- Class: Insecta
- Order: Coleoptera
- Suborder: Polyphaga
- Infraorder: Staphyliniformia
- Family: Staphylinidae
- Genus: Omalium
- Species: O. rugatum

Binomial name
- Omalium rugatum (Mulsant & Rey, 1880)

= Omalium rugatum =

Species of beetle

Omalium rugatum is a species of rove beetle native to Europe.
