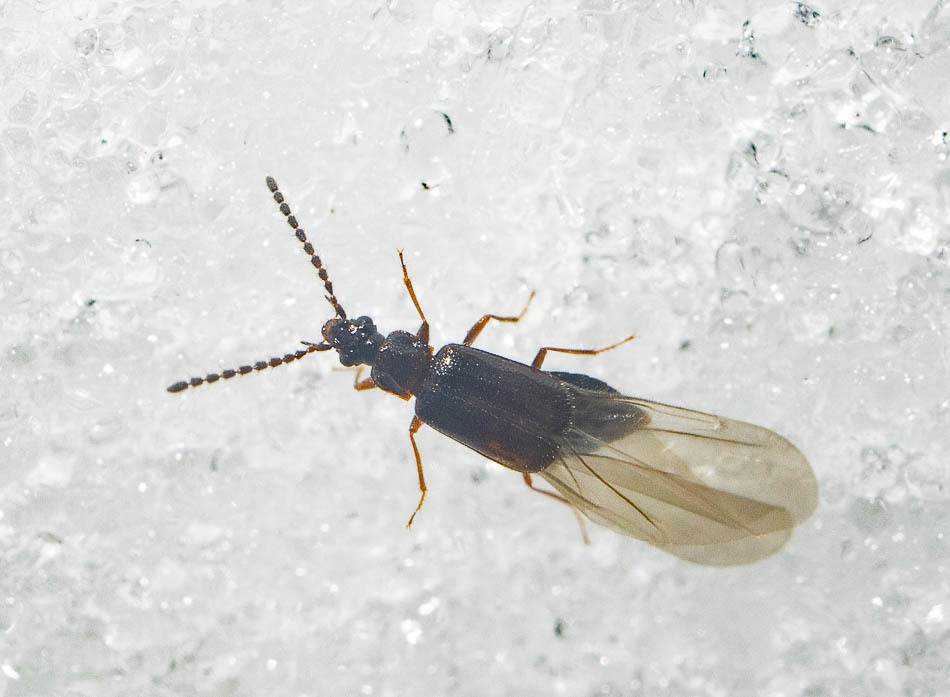
- Carcinocephalus flavidus in Calais, Vermont

Scientific classification
- Domain: Eukaryota
- Kingdom: Animalia
- Phylum: Arthropoda
- Class: Insecta
- Order: Coleoptera
- Suborder: Polyphaga
- Infraorder: Staphyliniformia
- Family: Staphylinidae
- Genus: Carcinocephalus
- Species: C. flavidus

Binomial name
- Carcinocephalus flavidus (Hamilton, 1895)

= Carcinocephalus flavidus =

Species of rove beetle

Carcinocephalus flavidus, or the winter rove beetle, is a species of rove beetle found in North America. It exhibits wing dimorphism between sexes, where males can be wingless, but females always are. The species was originally described as Omalium flavidum.

This beetle is found on snow in winter.
