= Omalium allardii =

Scientific classification
- Kingdom: Animalia
- Phylum: Arthropoda
- Class: Insecta
- Order: Coleoptera
- Suborder: Polyphaga
- Infraorder: Staphyliniformia
- Family: Staphylinidae
- Genus: Omalium
- Species: O. allardii

Binomial name
- Omalium allardii Fairmaire & Brisout de Barneville, 1859

Species of beetle

Omalium allardii is a species of beetle belonging to the family Staphylinidae.

It is native to Western Europe.

Synonym:

- Omalium allardi
