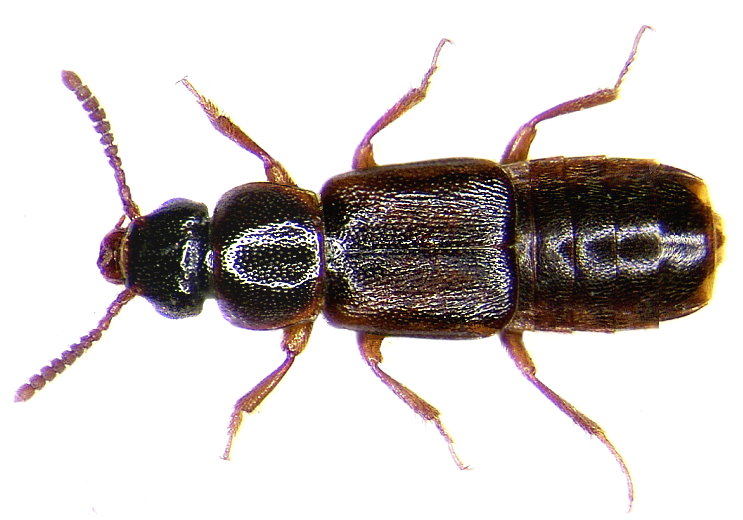
- Xylodromus brunnipennis 3-3,5 mm

Scientific classification
- Kingdom: Animalia
- Phylum: Arthropoda
- Class: Insecta
- Order: Coleoptera
- Suborder: Polyphaga
- Infraorder: Staphyliniformia
- Family: Staphylinidae
- Genus: Xylodromus
- Species: X. brunnipennis

Binomial name
- Xylodromus brunnipennis Stephens, 1832

= Xylodromus brunnipennis =

Species of beetle

Xylodromus brunnipennis is a species of rove beetle native to Europe.
