= Edaphus =

Scientific classification
- Kingdom: Animalia
- Phylum: Arthropoda
- Class: Insecta
- Order: Coleoptera
- Suborder: Polyphaga
- Infraorder: Staphyliniformia
- Family: Staphylinidae
- Tribe: Euaesthetini
- Genus: Edaphus; Motschulsky, 1857

Genus of beetles

Edaphus is a genus of beetles belonging to the family Staphylinidae.

The genus has cosmopolitan distribution.

Species:

- Edaphellus novaeguineae Fauvel, 1878
- Edaphus abdominalis Puthz, 1979
