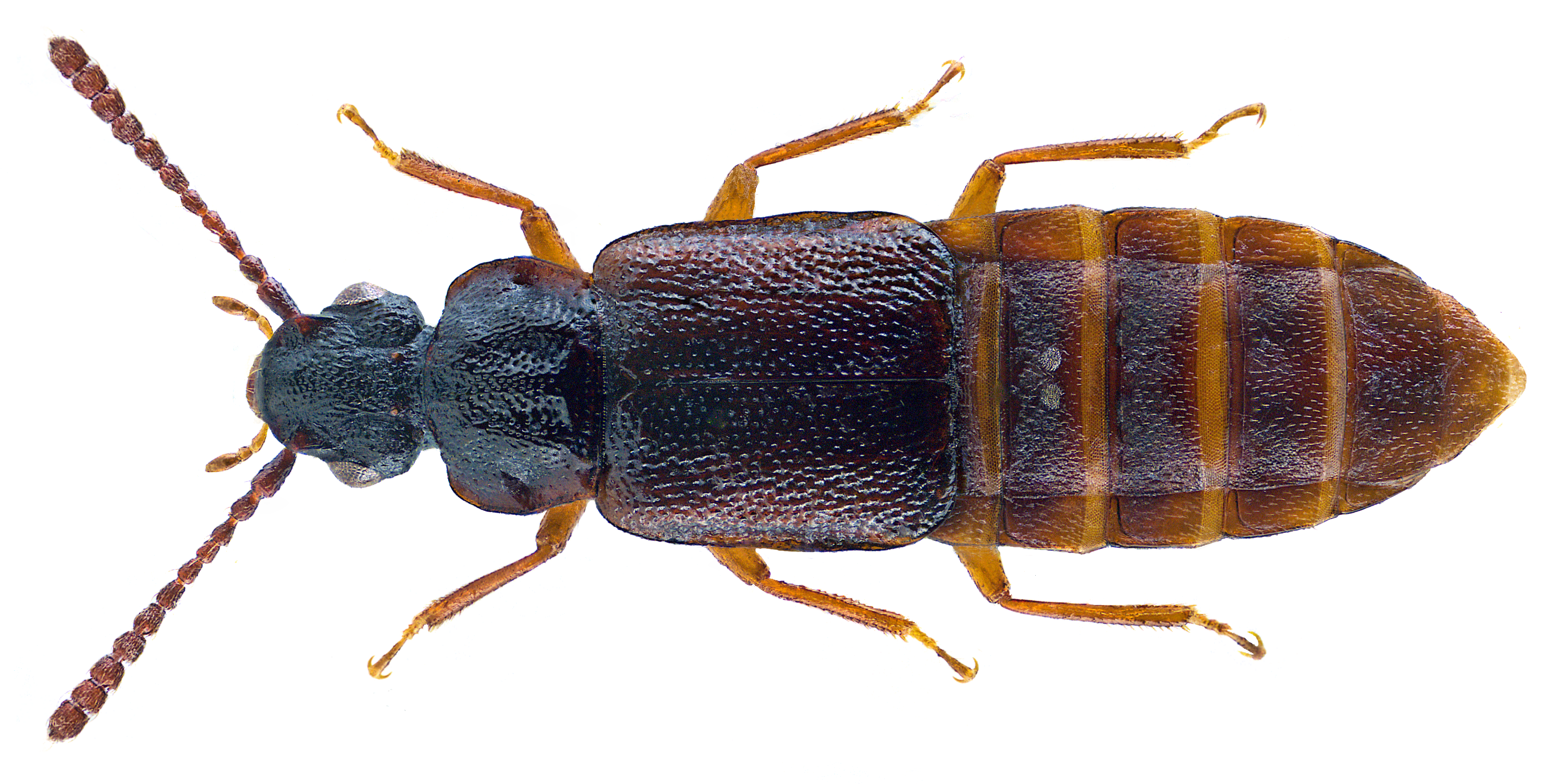
- Omalium caesum 3.5 mm (2.5 to 3.5 mm)

Scientific classification
- Domain: Eukaryota
- Kingdom: Animalia
- Phylum: Arthropoda
- Class: Insecta
- Order: Coleoptera
- Suborder: Polyphaga
- Infraorder: Staphyliniformia
- Family: Staphylinidae
- Genus: Omalium
- Species: O. caesum

Binomial name
- Omalium caesum Gravenhorst, 1806

= Omalium caesum =

Species of beetle

Omalium caesum is a species of rove beetle native to Europe.
