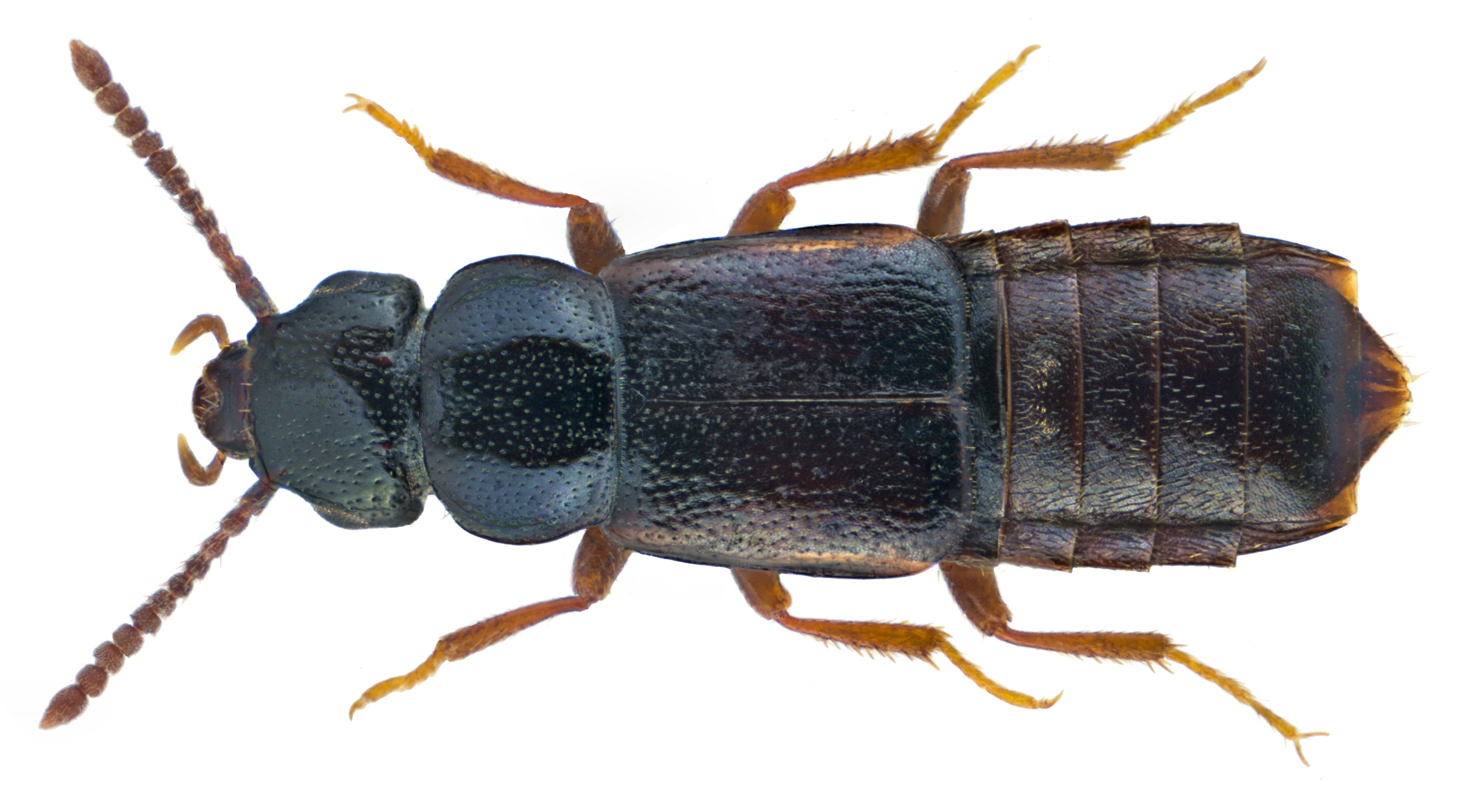

Scientific classification
- Kingdom: Animalia
- Phylum: Arthropoda
- Class: Insecta
- Order: Coleoptera
- Suborder: Polyphaga
- Infraorder: Staphyliniformia
- Family: Staphylinidae
- Genus: Xylodromus
- Species: X. affinis

Binomial name
- Xylodromus affinis (Gerhardt, 1877)

= Xylodromus affinis =

Species of beetle

Xylodromus affinis is a species of beetle in the Staphylinidae family, that can be found in Europe. The beetle is black, with brown legs and antennae.

The species are common in the Czech Republic and Slovakia.
