= Dilacera exokosmos =

Scientific classification
- Kingdom: Animalia
- Phylum: Arthropoda
- Clade: Pancrustacea
- Class: Insecta
- Order: Coleoptera
- Suborder: Polyphaga
- Infraorder: Staphyliniformia
- Family: Staphylinidae
- Genus: Dilacera
- Species: D. exokosmos

Binomial name
- Dilacera exokosmos Zilberman & Pires-Silva, 2022

Species of beetle

Dilacera exokosmos is a species of beetle of the family Staphylinidae. It is found in Brazil (Amazonas) and Bolivia.

== Life history ==
They are were found along with Uncitermes teevani.
