= Antonín Fleischer =

Czech medical doctor and entomologist (1850–1934)

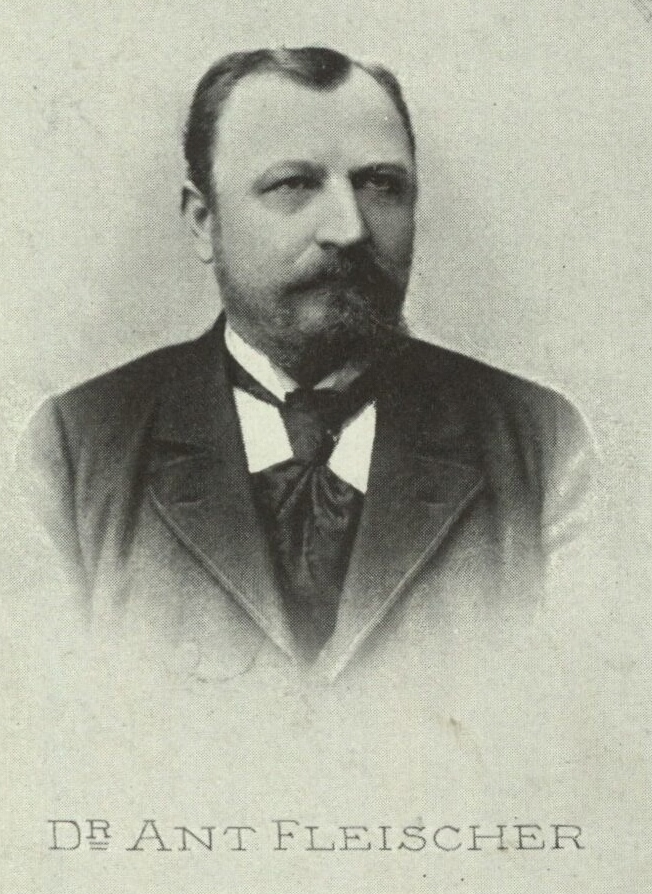
Portrait from c. 1899

Antonín Fleischer (17 February 1850 – 22 October 1934) was a Czech medical doctor and entomologist who specialised in beetles.

== Life and work ==
Fleischer was born on 17 February 1850 in Rovečné. He was born in a family with a clergy tradition. His brother Bohumil became a pastor while another, Josef, also became a medical doctor and entomologist. Fleischer studied at the grammar school in Těšín and then went to study medicine in Vienna and Prague where he received an MD in 1875. He then began practice at a maternity hospital in Brno. In 1878, he worked in the military service and after 1880 stated a private practice. He worked in the Moravian Health Council from 1891 as well as in Vienna from 1909. In 1910 he received a Knight's Cross from Franz Joseph I. Fleischer was interested in beetles from a young age, being influenced by Edmund Reitter at school. While studying in Prague, he worked at the zoological collections and went on collection trips with Emanuel Lokaj, Karl Skalitzky, J. Stussiner and others. In 1873, he was involved in an entomological exhibit at the World's Fair in Vienna of 1873. His collection of nearly 30,000 specimens including the types of species described by him were purchased by the National Museum, Prague in 1935.

Several taxa have been named in his honour including Xylodromus fleischeri, Agrilus fleischeri, Anthaxia fleischeri, Dilacra fleischera, Plectophoeus fleischeri, and Caenoscelis fleischeri.

Fleischer died on 22 October 1934 in Brno and was buried at the Brno Central Cemetery. His neo-Gothic tomb with sandstone sculptures of angels is a valuable artistic work and is protected as a cultural monument.
