= Stictocraniini =

Scientific classification
- Kingdom: Animalia
- Phylum: Arthropoda
- Clade: Pancrustacea
- Class: Insecta
- Order: Coleoptera
- Suborder: Polyphaga
- Infraorder: Staphyliniformia
- Family: Staphylinidae
- Subfamily: Euaesthetinae
- Tribe: Stictocraniini; Jakobson, 1914

Tribe of beetles

Stictocraniini is a tribe of rove beetles in the subfamily Euaesthetinae. It was first described in 1914 by Jakobson. It contains 11 species split between two genera. The majority of observations have been made in the United States, with a few also made in Canada.

== Genera ==
- Fenderia
- Stictocranius
