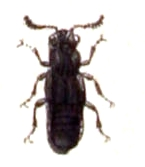

Scientific classification
- Kingdom: Animalia
- Phylum: Arthropoda
- Class: Insecta
- Order: Coleoptera
- Suborder: Polyphaga
- Infraorder: Staphyliniformia
- Family: Staphylinidae
- Genus: Xylodromus
- Species: X. depressus

Binomial name
- Xylodromus depressus (Gravenhorst, 1802)

= Xylodromus depressus =

Species of beetle

Xylodromus depressus is a brown coloured species of beetle in the rove beetle family, that can be found in Albania, Austria, Belgium, Bulgaria, the Czech Republic, France, Germany, Greece, Hungary, Italy, Poland, Portugal, Romania, Russia, Slovakia, Switzerland, the Netherlands, and Ukraine. It can also be found in the Baltic states, Scandinavian countries and all of the republics of former Yugoslavia.
