= Rovečné =

- Municipality
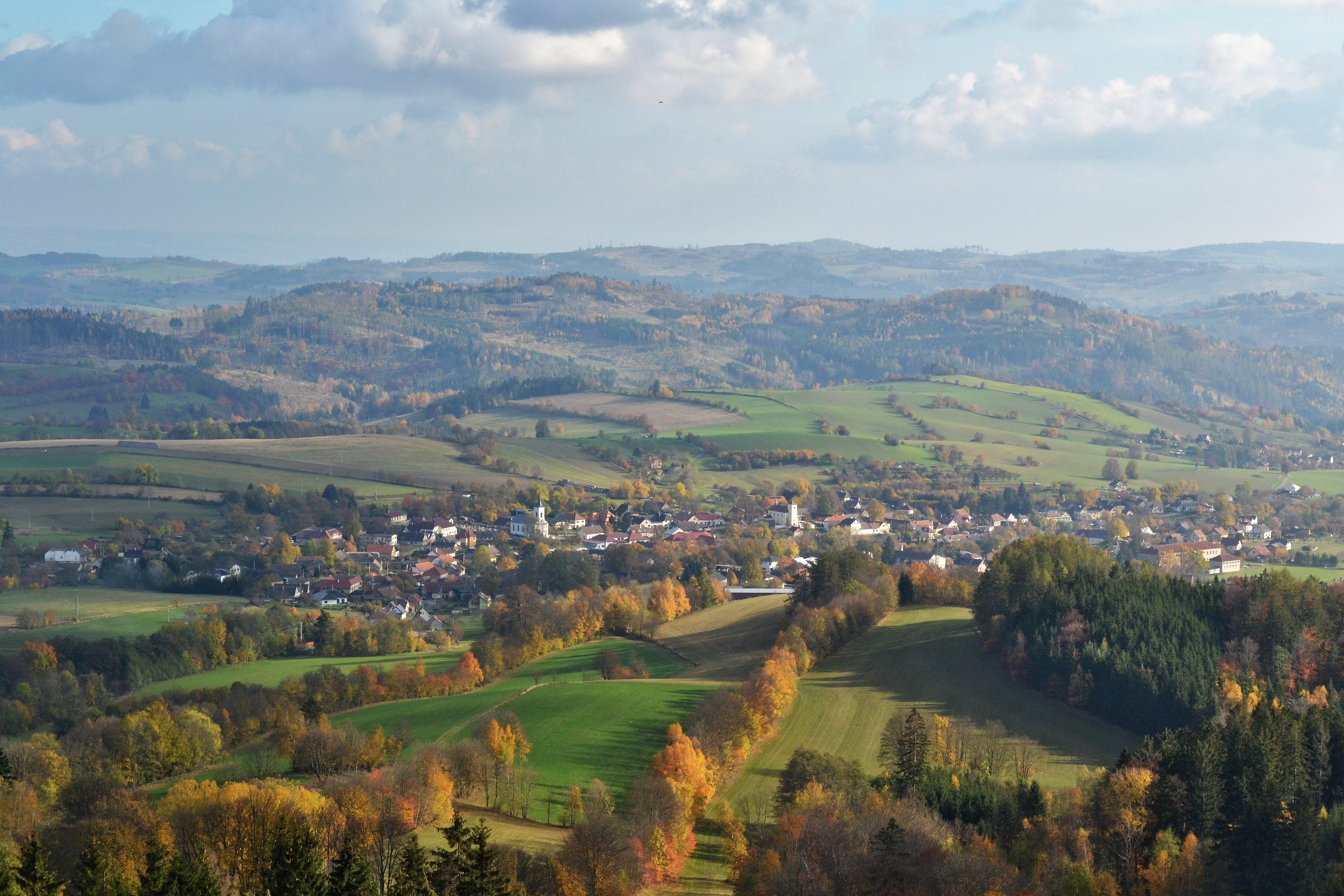
- General view

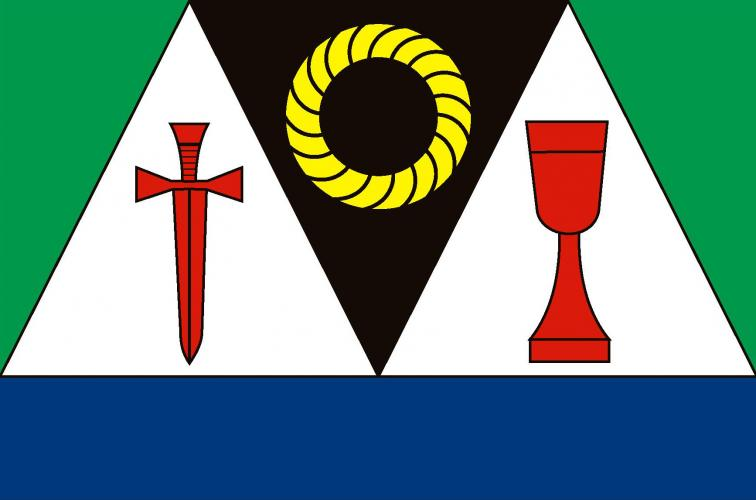
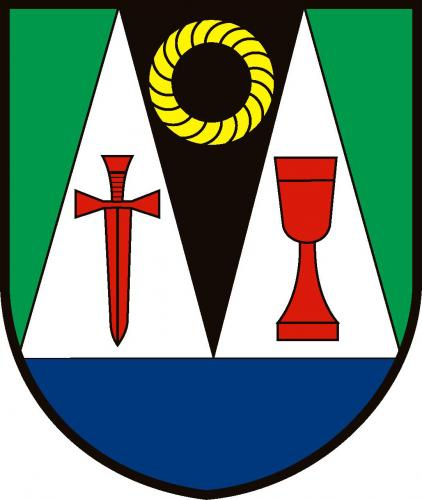
- Flag Coat of arms

- Location in the Czech Republic
- Coordinates: 49°34′40″N 16°21′45″E
- Country: Czech Republic
- Region: Vysočina
- District: Žďár nad Sázavou
- First mentioned: 1335

Area
  - Total: 11.74 km^{2} (4.53 sq mi)
- Elevation: 572 m (1,877 ft)

Population (2026-01-01)
  - Total: 583
  - Density: 49.7/km^{2} (129/sq mi)
- Time zone: UTC+1 (CET)
  - Summer (DST): UTC+2 (CEST)
- Postal code: 592 65
- Website: www.rovecne.cz

Rovečné (German: Rowetschin) is a municipality and village in Žďár nad Sázavou District in the Vysočina Region of the Czech Republic. It has about 600 inhabitants.

Rovečné lies approximately 31 kilometres (19 mi) east of Žďár nad Sázavou, 60 kilometres (37 mi) east of Jihlava, and 150 kilometres (93 mi) east of Prague.

== Administrative division ==
Rovečné consists of two municipal parts (in brackets population according to the 2021 census):

- Rovečné (553)
- Malé Tresné (62)

== Demographics ==
Historical population
Year	Pop.	±%
1869	1,003	—
1880	962	−4.1%
1890	932	−3.1%
1900	1,024	+9.9%
1910	983	−4.0%
1921	964	−1.9%
1930	909	−5.7%
1950	771	−15.2%
1961	809	+4.9%
1970	871	+7.7%
1980	818	−6.1%
1991	730	−10.8%
2001	660	−9.6%
2011	628	−4.8%
2021	615	−2.1%
Source: Censuses

== Notable people ==
- Antonín Fleischer (1850–1934), physician and entomologist
