= Otto Scheerpeltz =

Austrian entomologist (1888–1975)

Otto Scheerpeltz (16 July 1888, Olomouc - 10 November 1975, Vienna) was an Austrian entomologist who specialized in the study of beetles, particularly the rove-beetles, Staphylinidae.

Scheerpeltz was born in Olomouc where he went to the local schools. Although interested in plants and animals, he followed his father's advice to study civil engineering at the Technical University. He taught geometry and technical drawing for a while in Vienna and became a full-time teacher in 1910. He started studying zoology and botany in 1922 and received a doctoral summa cum laude in 1930. He did not complete his habilitation due to the outbreak of World War II. He retired as a teacher from the Schottenfelder Oberrrealschule, Vienna in 1945 and joined the Natural History Museum, Vienna in 1948. He helped build the collections and the library there and retired in 1953.

His collection of Staphylinidae included 300000 specimens with about 10,000 types was bequeathed to the Natural History Museum, Vienna. He authored a catalogue of the Staphylinidae of the world in collaboration with Max Bernhauer. Published in 1926, they described 12,740 species.
