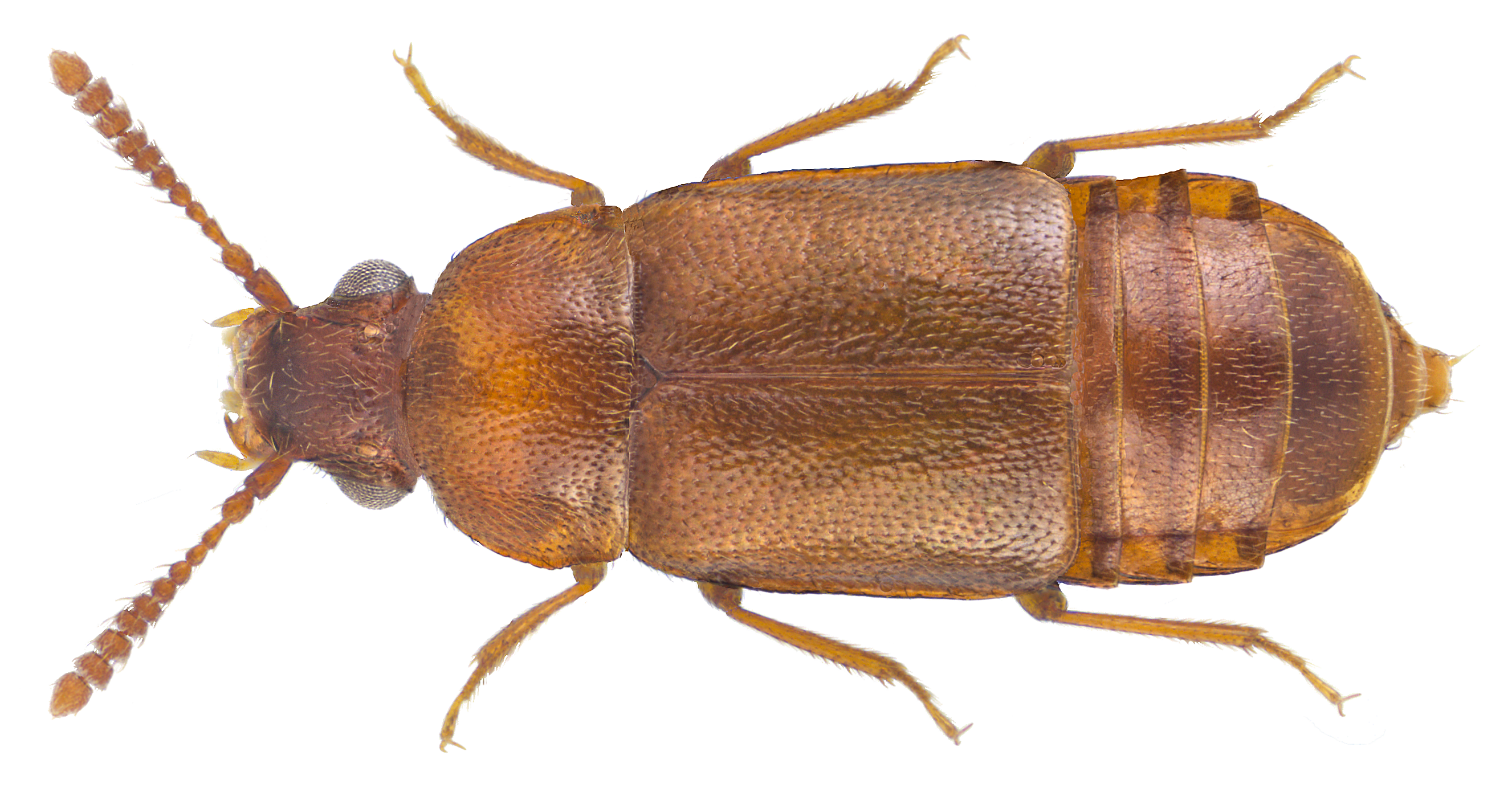
- Hapalaraea pygmaea

Scientific classification
- Kingdom: Animalia
- Phylum: Arthropoda
- Class: Insecta
- Order: Coleoptera
- Suborder: Polyphaga
- Infraorder: Staphyliniformia
- Family: Staphylinidae
- Genus: Hapalaraea; Thomson, 1858

= Hapalaraea =

Genus of beetles

Hapalaraea is a genus of beetles belonging to the family Staphylinidae.

The species of this genus are found in Europe and North America.

Species:

- Hapalaraea alutacea (Reitter, 1909)
- Hapalaraea hamata (Fauvel, 1878)
