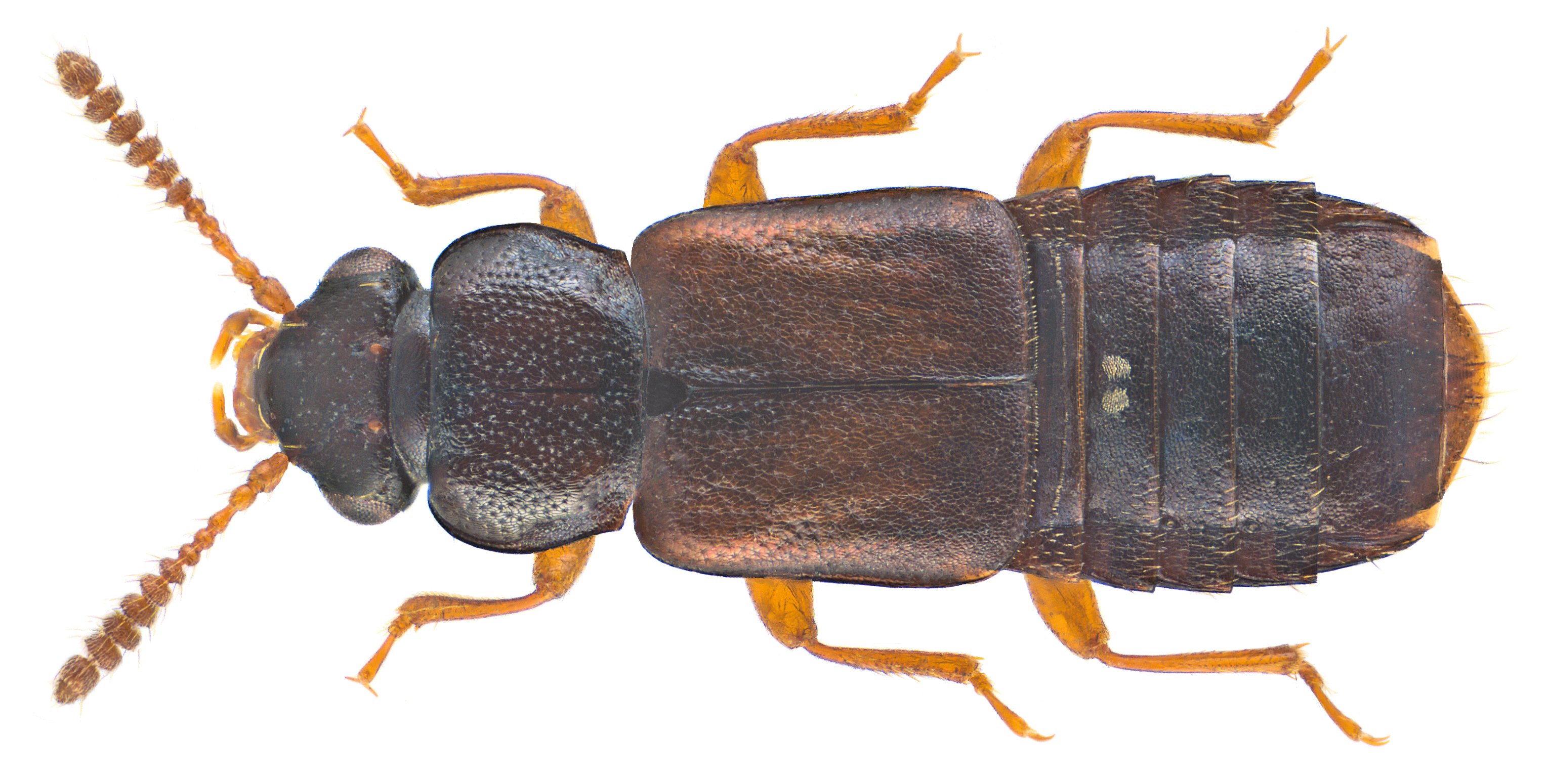
- Phloeostiba plana

Scientific classification
- Kingdom: Animalia
- Phylum: Arthropoda
- Clade: Pancrustacea
- Class: Insecta
- Order: Coleoptera
- Suborder: Polyphaga
- Infraorder: Staphyliniformia
- Family: Staphylinidae
- Genus: Phloeostiba; Thomson, 1858

= Phloeostiba =

Genus of beetles

Phloeostiba is a genus of beetles belonging to the family Staphylinidae.

The species of this genus are found in Eurasia, Australia and North America.

Species:

- Phloeostiba azorica (Fauvel, 1900)
- Phloeostiba hammondi
- Phloeostiba kamijoi Watanabe, 2009
