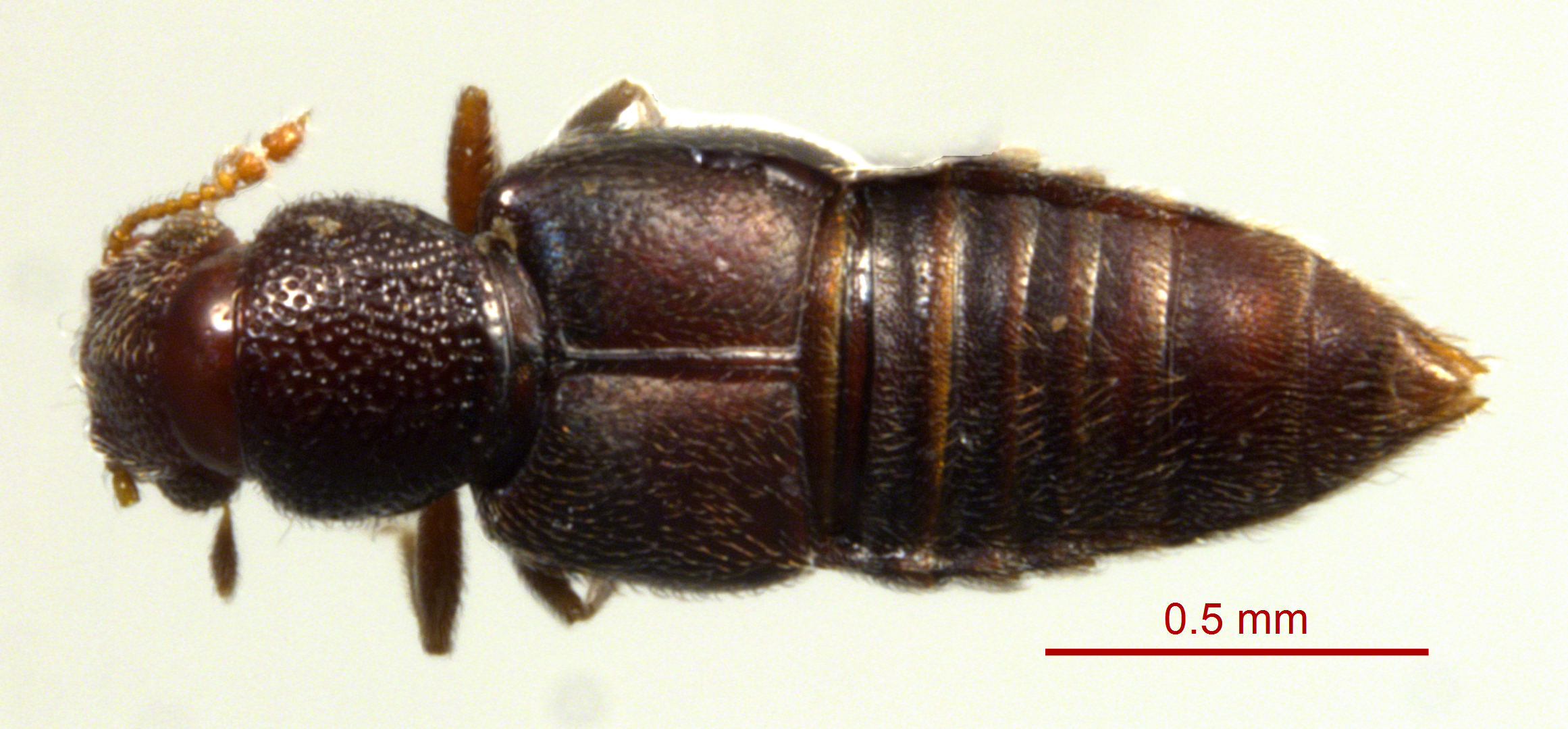
- Euaesthetus sp.

Scientific classification
- Kingdom: Animalia
- Phylum: Arthropoda
- Clade: Pancrustacea
- Class: Insecta
- Order: Coleoptera
- Suborder: Polyphaga
- Infraorder: Staphyliniformia
- Family: Staphylinidae
- Subfamily: Euaesthetinae; Thomson, 1859

Tribes
- Alzadaesthetini Scheerpeltz, 1974; Austroesthetini Cameron, 1944; Euaesthetini Thomson, C. G., 1859; Nordenskioldiini Bernhauer & Schubert, 1911; Stenaesthetini Bernhauer & Schubert, 1911; Stictocraniini Jakobson, 1914

= Euaesthetinae =

Subfamily of beetles

The Euaesthetinae are a subfamily of the Staphylinidae (Coleoptera) containing six tribes.

These rove beetles have slender antennae with two or three apical antennomeres forming a loose club. The tarsi have 4-4-4 or 5-5-5 (5-5-4 in some exotic genera) segments. They are found in forest litter. Five genera and 22 species known from North America.

== Gallery ==
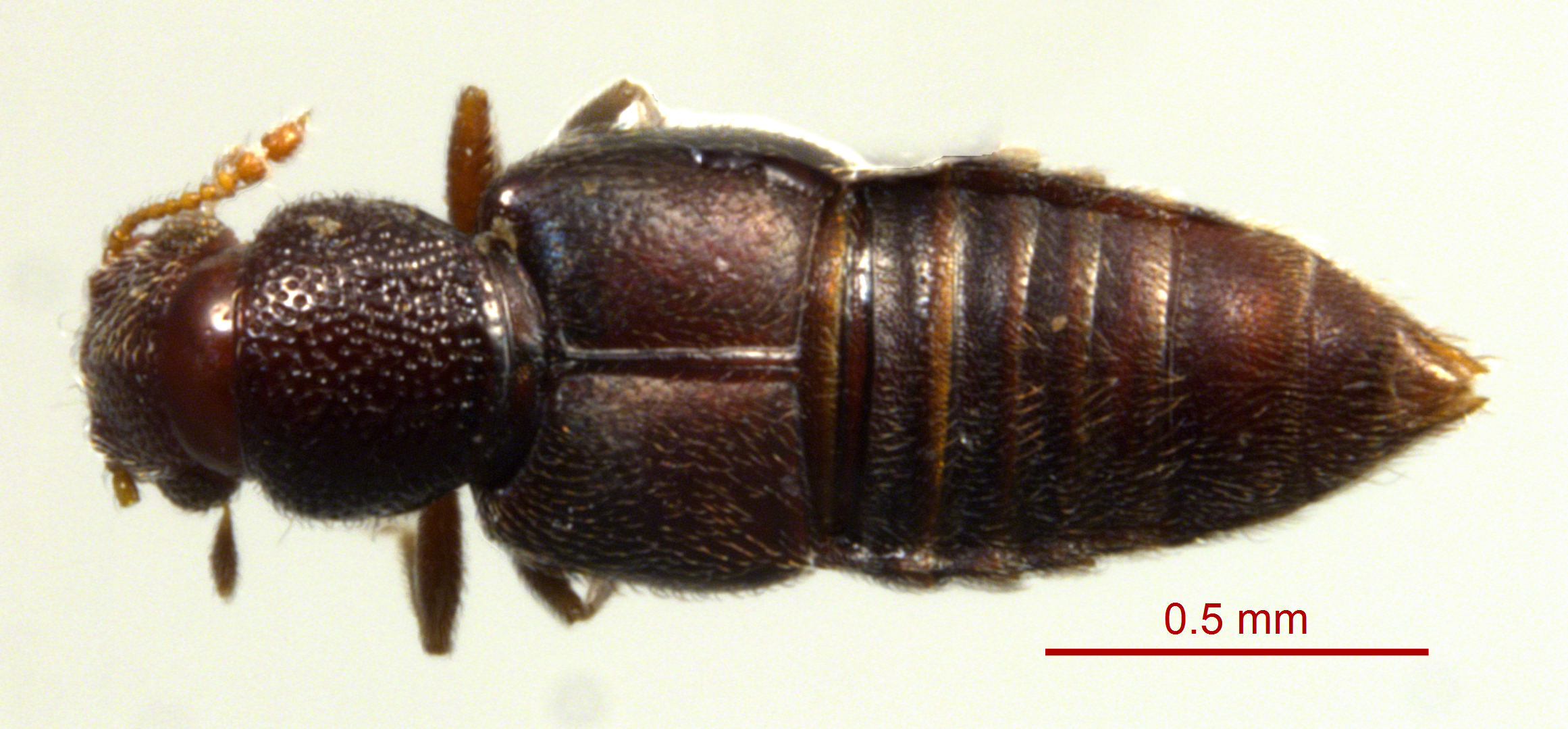
Euaesthetus sp.

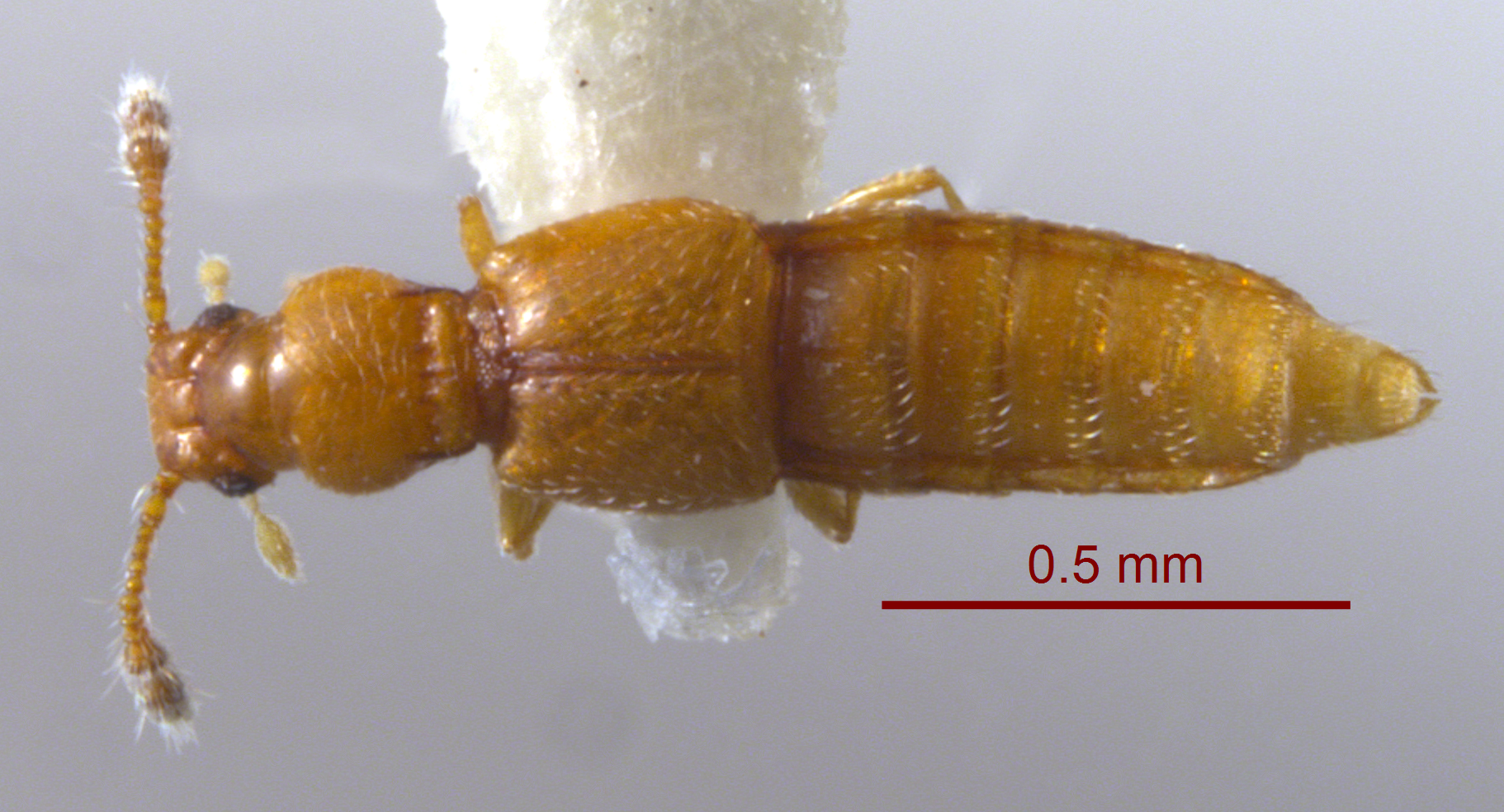
Edaphus sp.
