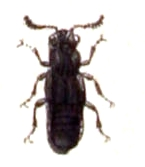

Scientific classification
- Kingdom: Animalia
- Phylum: Arthropoda
- Clade: Pancrustacea
- Class: Insecta
- Order: Coleoptera
- Suborder: Polyphaga
- Infraorder: Staphyliniformia
- Family: Staphylinidae
- Genus: Xylodromus; Heer, 1839

= Xylodromus =

Genus of beetles

Xylodromus a genus of beetles in the family Staphylinidae, subfamily Omaliinae.

== List of species ==
- Xylodromus affinis (Gerhardt, 1877)
- Xylodromus brunnipennis (Stephens, 1832)
- Xylodromus concinnus (Marsham, 1802)
- Xylodromus fleischeri Lokay, 1917
- Xylodromus depressus (Gravenhorst, 1802)
- Xylodromus sassuchini Kirshenblat, 1936
- Xylodromus testaceus (Erichson, 1840)
- Xylodromus uralensis Kirshenblat, 1936
