= Termitonannini =

Scientific classification
- Kingdom: Animalia
- Phylum: Arthropoda
- Class: Insecta
- Order: Coleoptera
- Suborder: Polyphaga
- Infraorder: Staphyliniformia
- Family: Staphylinidae
- Subfamily: Aleocharinae
- Tribe: Termitonannini; Fenyes, 1918

Subtribes
- Perinthina (Bernhauer & Scheerpeltz, 1926); Termitonannina (Fenyes, 1918)

Tribe of beetles

Termitonannini is a tribe of rove beetles in the subfamily Aleocharinae.
