= Max Bernhauer =

Austrian notary and entomologist (1866–1946)

Max Bernhauer (24 September 1866 in Mohelnice, Austria-Hungary – 13 March 1946 in Horn, Austria) was an Austrian entomologist who specialised in Coleoptera, especially Staphylinidae. He described over 5,000 species.

Bernhauser was the son of a clerk at Müglitz. He received his schooling at Olomouc. He studied and received a law degree from the University of Vienna in 1899. He worked as a notary at various times at Vienna, Stockerau, Grünburg and then at Horn to supplement his amateur studies. He became interested in beetles while at university and interacted with several entomologists including Ganglbauer, Luze, and Spaeth. His first publications were on the Staphylinidae and received specimens from around the world. In 1910 he began to work on a world catalogue of the Staphylinidae in collaboration with Karl Schubert and Otto Scheerpeltz. He published nearly 285 papers, describing 5251 species in 342 genera. His collection was sold off after his death and most of the types are in the Field Museum of Natural History in Chicago.
