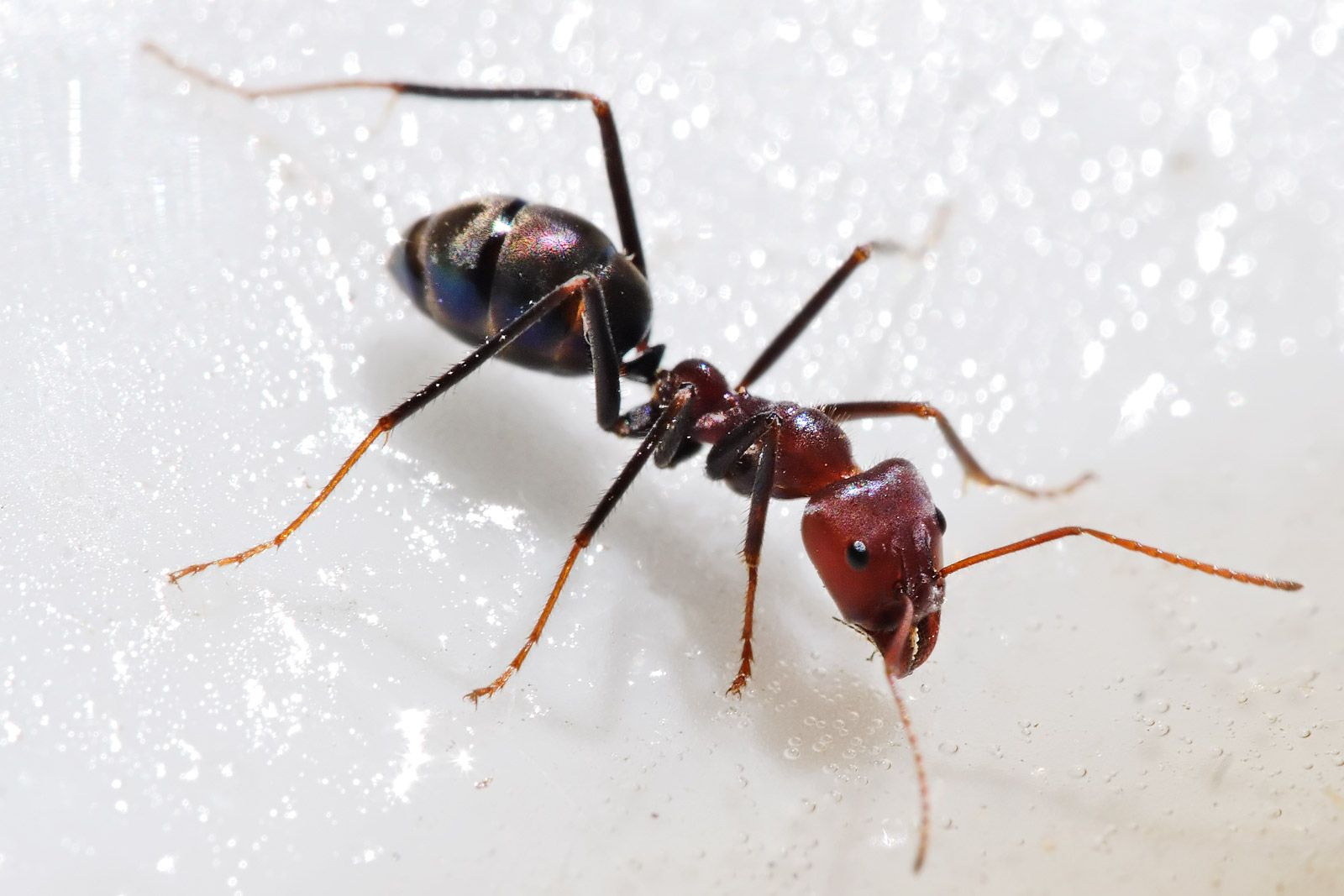
- Meat ant worker feeding on honey

Scientific classification
- Kingdom: Animalia
- Phylum: Arthropoda
- Clade: Pancrustacea
- Class: Insecta
- Order: Hymenoptera
- Family: Formicidae
- Subfamily: Dolichoderinae
- Genus: Iridomyrmex
- Species: I. purpureus

Binomial name
- Iridomyrmex purpureus (Smith, 1858)

Synonyms
- Liometopum aeneum Mayr, 1862; Iridomyrmex detectus castrae Viehmeyer, 1925; Formica detecta Smith, F., 1858; Iridomyrmex greensladei Shattuck, 1993; Camponotus horni Kirby, 1896; Formica smithii Lowne, 1865

= Meat ant =

Common Australian ant

The meat ant (Iridomyrmex purpureus), also known as the gravel ant or southern meat ant, is a species of ant endemic to Australia. A member of the genus Iridomyrmex in the subfamily Dolichoderinae, it was described by British entomologist Frederick Smith in 1858. The meat ant is associated with many common names due to its appearance, nest-building behaviour and abundance, of which its specific name, purpureus, refers to its coloured appearance. It is among the best-known species of ant found throughout Australia; it occurs in almost all states and territories except for Tasmania. Its enormous distribution, aggression and ecological importance have made this ant a dominant species.

The meat ant is monomorphic (occurs in a particular form), although there is evidence that certain populations can be polymorphic. It is characterised by its dark-bluish body and red head. It is a medium to large species, measuring 6–12 mm (0.24–0.47 in). The workers and males are approximately the same sizes at 6–7 mm (0.24–0.28 in) and 8 mm (0.31 in), respectively. The queens are the largest and appear mostly black, measuring 12.7 mm (0.50 in). The iridescence in workers ranges from green or blue to plain green and purple, varying in different body parts and castes. Meat ants inhabit open and warm areas in large, oval-shaped mounds that are accompanied by many entrance holes. The nest area is always cleared of vegetation and covered with materials including gravel, pebbles and dead vegetation. They are also polydomous, where a colony may be established in a series of satellite nests connected by well-defined paths and trails. Satellite nests are constructed away from the main nest in nearby areas with valuable food sources so workers can exploit them.

Queens mate with a single male and colonies may have more than one queen until the workers arrive, where they both exhibit antagonism. It takes around one or two months for an individual egg to develop into an adult. Colonies range in size, varying between 11,000 individuals to over 300,000. The meat ant is a diurnal species (active throughout most of the day), especially when it is warm. It forages on trees and collects sweet substances such as honeydew and nectar, and also captures insects or collects the remains of animals. A number of predators eat these ants, including the short-beaked echidna (Tachyglossus aculeatus), numerous species of birds, blind snakes and spiders. This species is also a competitor of the banded sugar ant (Camponotus consobrinus). Meat ants establish territorial borders with neighbouring colonies and solve disputes through ritualised fighting.

Meat ants play an important role in both the environment and for humans. A single nest is capable of dispersing over 300,000 plant seeds; moreover, meat ants have formed symbiotic relationships with many insects. This ant may be used as a form of pest control to kill the cane toad, an invasive species. They can also help farmers to remove animal carcasses by consuming and reducing them to bones in a matter of weeks. Despite this, meat ants are sometimes pests around urban areas and eradicating them is difficult.

== Taxonomy ==
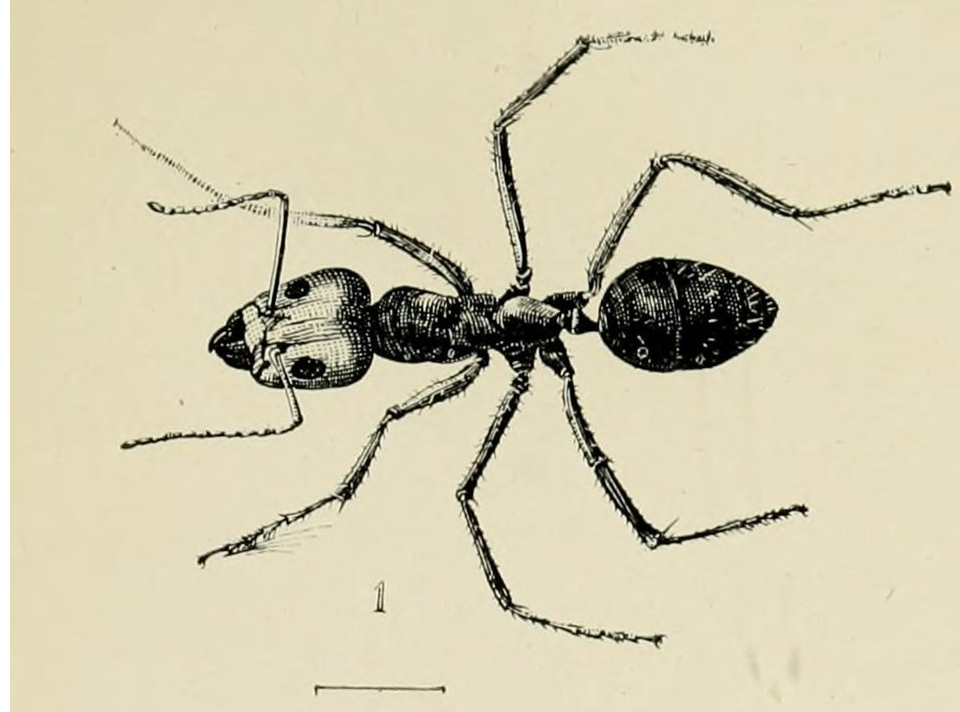
Worker, W.W. Froggatt, 1907

The meat ant was first described in 1858 by British entomologist Frederick Smith in his Catalogue of Hymenopterous Insects in the Collection of the British Museum part VI, under the binomial name Formica purpurea from a holotype worker ant he collected in Melbourne, Victoria. The type material is currently housed in the Natural History Museum, London. In 1862, Austrian entomologist Gustav Mayr erected the genus Iridomyrmex, and reclassified the meat ant as a member of Iridomyrmex rather than the genus Formica. The ant was named Iridomyrmex purpurea in 1862. Mayr renamed the ant as Iridomyrmex purpureus one year after. I. purpureus was later classified as a synonym of Iridomyrmex detectus, and this taxon was designated as the type species of Iridomyrmex in 1903.

In 1993, I. detectus was synonymised with I. purpureus and grouped into the I. purpureus species complex. I. detectus was described as a separate species by Smith the same year as I. purpureus from two syntype queens he collected from the Hunter River in New South Wales. Although the name I. purpureus was used by many authors, Karl Wilhelm von Dalla Torre reused I. detectus and this was adopted by several authors, replacing I. purpureus. By the 1960s I. purpureus once again became preferred over I. detectus. While the two names were described in the same year and publication, the name I. purpureus is the valid name for the species in accordance with the International Code of Zoological Nomenclature. Entomologist B.T. Lowne was the first person to revise I. purpureus and I. detectus, and he synonymised the two species.

Several synonyms have either been classified as a separate species from the meat ant or even a subspecies. Iridomyrmex purpureus sanguineus and I. p. viridiaeneus were classified as subspecies in 1974, previously being recognised as two species. I. detectus castrae was originally described as a variant of the meat ant in 1925 (as I. d. var. castrae), but the taxon was reclassified as a subspecies in 1985; subsequently, a 1993 revision reclassified I. p. sanguineus and I. p. viridiaeneus at species level while I. d. castrae was synonymised, based on morphological examinations of collected material.

Camponotus horni, Formica smithii and Liometopum aeneum were described as three distinct species in three different ant genera, but these classifications were short-lived, as scientists discovered that these taxa were all identical, and subsequently synonymised them with the meat ant. Camponotus horni was described by English entomologist William Forsell Kirby in 1896 from worker and queen syntypes he collected at Palm Creek in the Northern Territory. In 1930, Australian entomologist John S. Clark reviewed these specimens and synonymised the taxon with the meat ant. However, the queen was later found to be distinct from the workers and C. horni was redescribed as a species. The information provided by Clark makes it sufficient to retain the validity of the name, making Clark the new author of C. horni. The taxonomic status of Clark's C. horni was uncertain and remained a junior homonym for Kirby's C. horni, until American entomologist Brian Fisher renamed Clark's C. horni to Camponotus durnyx in 2025.

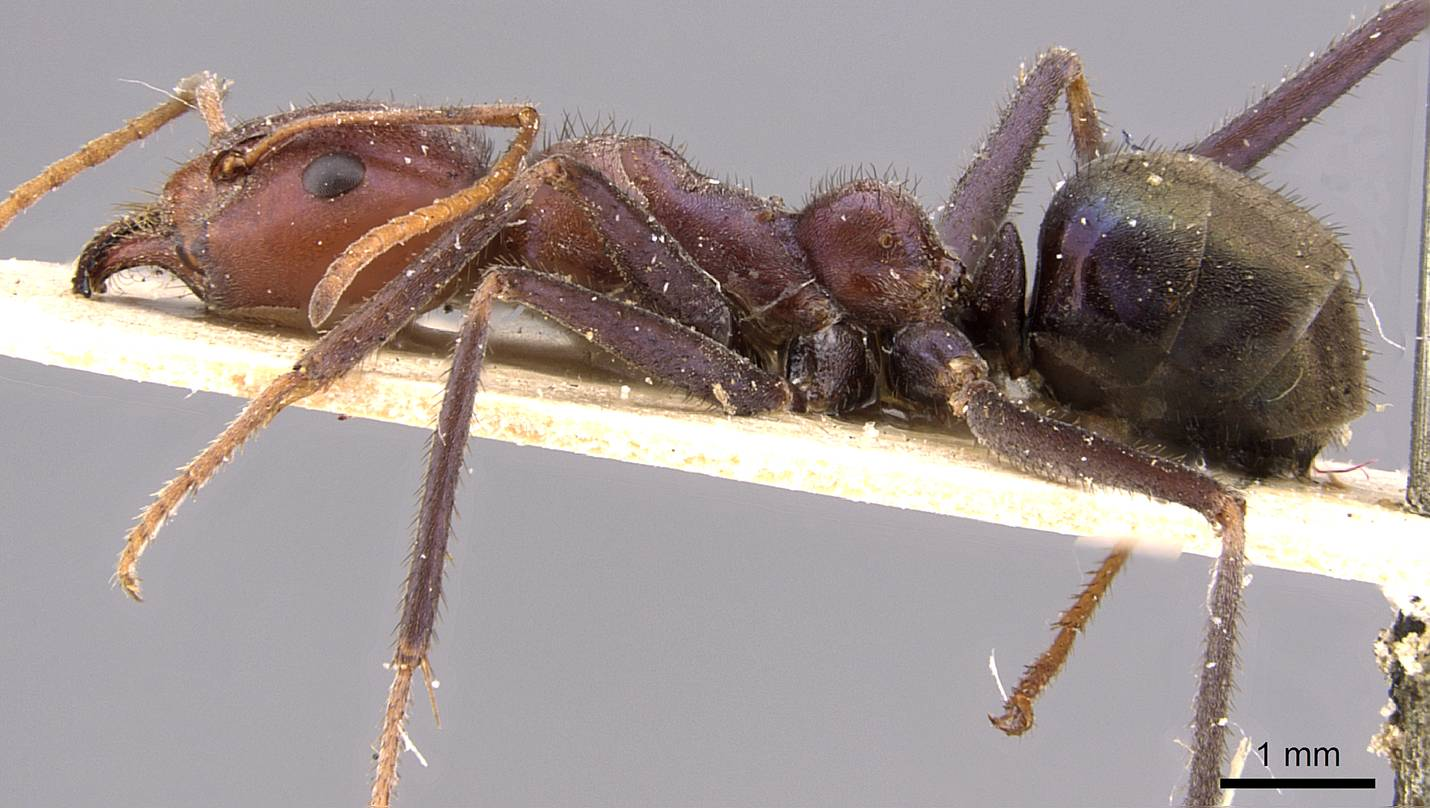
Syntype specimen of I. detectus castrae, Natural History Museum of Geneva

One synonym, Iridomyrmex greensladei, was described as a separate species from the meat ant based on the anatomical differences of its head and pronotum (the dorsal portion of the prothorax's exoskeletal plates), which are the same colour as its mesosoma. In the meat ant, the head and pronotum are usually lighter than the mesosoma. American entomologist Steve Shattuck notes that the two ants are non-sympatric (they exist in different geographic areas), and supporting evidence to separate them as two distinct species emerged when the enzymes esterase and amylase were examined and the results show that they had different amylase allele.

These examinations did not take any account of any distinction in colour between populations previously known as I. greensladei and I. purpureus. For example, colonies residing in Western Australia may have lighter heads whereas those living in the eastern states have darker heads. An unpublished study examining the mitochondrial DNA did not find any distinction between eastern and western populations of I. greensladei and I. purpureus. Additional evidence suggests that the populations found in the east and west are the same species.

Despite this evidence, there are several problems: forms intended to be I. greensladei were found in the Yorke Peninsula by a 1987 study, which noted that while the ants were morphologically indistinguishable from both I. greensladei and I. purpureus populations, their nests only contained a single nest hole (whereas I. purpureus nests have many). Shattuck also collected workers for his holotype and paratype specimens from Israelite Bay in Western Australia, rather than collecting those from Yorke Peninsula. The forms in Yorke Peninsula have also never been subject to study, so future research may shed light as to whether or not these ants are genetically different from the meat ant.

Under the present classification, the meat ant is a member of the genus Iridomyrmex in the tribe Leptomyrmecini, subfamily Dolichoderinae. It is a member of the family Formicidae, belonging to the order Hymenoptera, an order of insects containing ants, bees, and wasps. The genus Froggattella is the sister group of Iridomyrmex, both of which are in a clade that is 23 million years old. Fossils related to the meat ant and other species are from the Eocene and Oligocene.

=== Forms ===
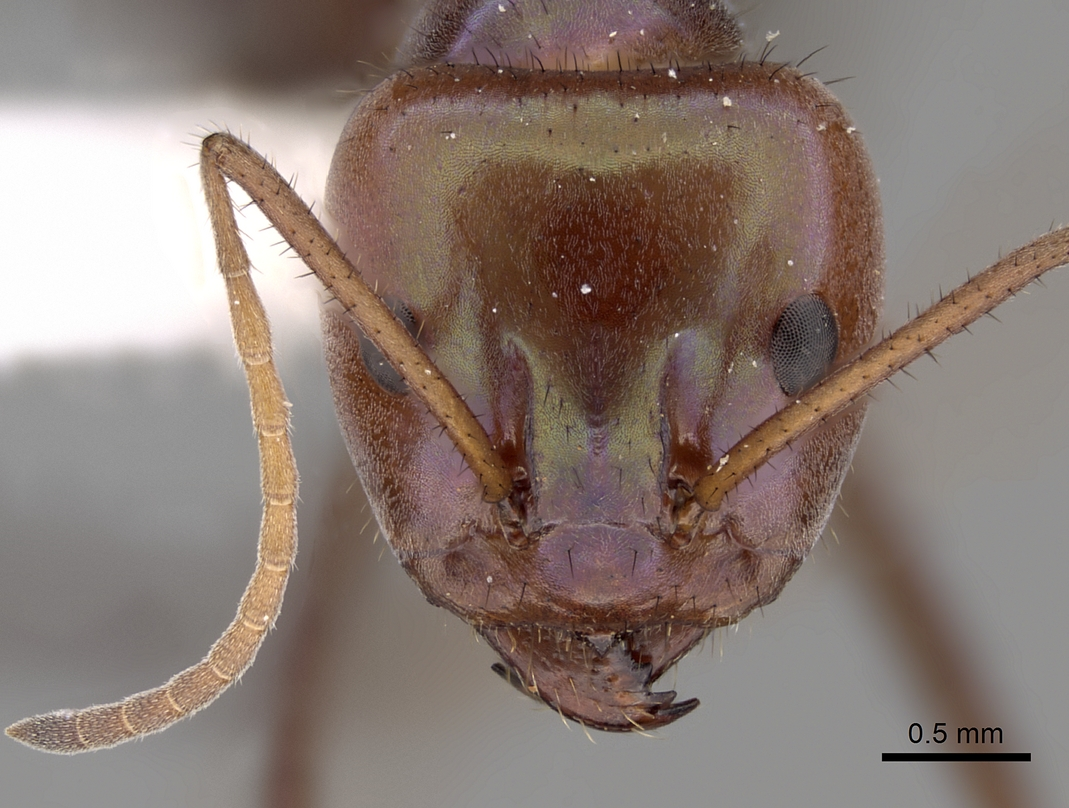
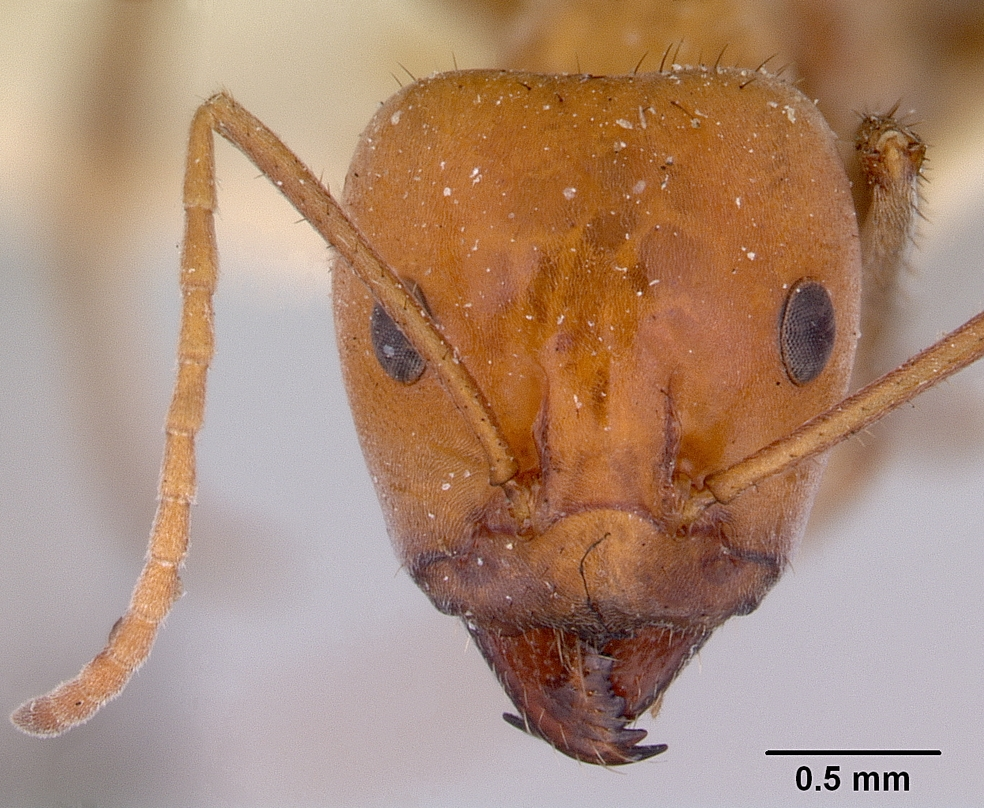
Differentiated colouration of heads of I. viridiaeneus (left) and I. sanguineus (right). These ants were classified as two subspecies of I. purpureus until they were raised to full species in 1993.

In the early 1970s, scientists discovered several different forms of meats ants, forming the Iridomyrmex purpureus species group; three forms were identified (the regular I. purpureus and the other two forms I. sanguineus and I. viridiaeneus), differing in colour and nest structure. However, as there were no clear morphological differences among these variations, the taxonomic status and evolutionary relationship of these ants remained uncertain. Colouration varies from ants with a red head and thorax and a blue metallic sheen, to those with a yellowish body and a bluish-purple gaster. Others may be darker, appearing metallic-bluish to purplish-black.

Owing to their different geographical ranges, the behaviour and ecology of these forms differentiated, based on examinations where multiple forms were sympatric. Each form had its own geographical limit, although the regular I. purpureus form is very common, inhabiting at least one-third of the Australian continent. Some forms may be dominant in certain habitats; for example, one form may be widespread throughout moist environments in dry areas, and others in cool and dry areas.

In 1974, I. sanguineus and I. viridiaeneus were classified as two subspecies of the meat ant by P.J. Greenslade. He also recognised another form, an undescribed blue form that was first studied several years earlier. Greenslade did not propose any taxonomic recognition of the newly discovered taxon, but instead referred to it as a "form". In 1975, a study examined the distinctiveness of three forms by comparing the amylase enzyme allele frequencies. The blue form was found to be genetically isolated and its allele frequencies differed significantly from the forms purpureus and viridiaeneus, but the same study concluded that these latter two forms were similar. During this time, Greenslade would continue to study these forms to include a dark yellow, yellow, orange and a small purple form.

In addition, two new forms were recognised in later studies, but these two forms were not given any formal species description. Instead, they were only recognised by their colour and the genitalia of the males. Although these forms most likely represented undescribed, yet distinct species, the I. purpureus species group only contained a single valid species, three subspecies and seven different forms. In 1993, all known forms and subspecies were either revived or classified at species level in an article revising the group, concluding the separation of the forms from each other.

=== Etymology and common names ===
The specific epithet of the meat ant, purpureus, derives from Latin, in which it means "purple", "purple-coloured" or "dark-red", referencing the coloured appearance of the ant. In classical Latin, purpureus primarily translated to "dyed purple", while the word purpura, used by Smith for the meat ant (Formica purpura), translates to "purpled-dyed cloth". The generic name, Iridomyrmex, translates to "rainbow ants" from Ancient Greek, another reference which points to its appearance. This, in particular, is due to its blue-green iridescence colour. It is a compound of two Ancient Greek words – iris, meaning "rainbow", and myrmex, that means "ant".

The ant is commonly known as the meat ant because of its habit of stripping the meat off dead vertebrates. Alternative names include the gravel ant, Greenslade's meat ant, meat-eater ant, mound ant, or southern meat ant. The name "southern meat ant" is due to its extreme abundance in the southern regions of Australia.

== Description ==
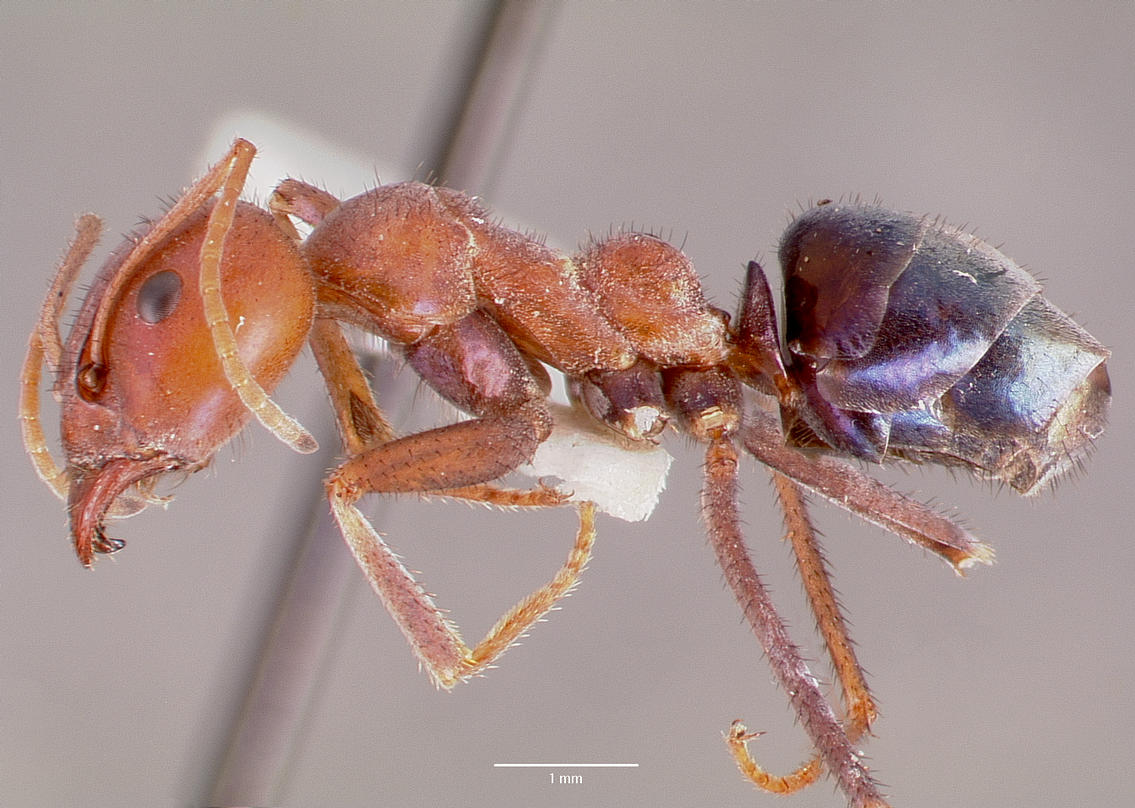
Worker

In general, meat ants are medium to large in size, measuring 6–12 mm (0.24–0.47 in), and can be easily recognised by their dark-bluish body and red head. Generally, their heads and pronotums share similar colours and are lighter than the mesothorax (the middle of the three segments in the thorax) and the propodeum (the first abdominal segment), which are reddish brown. However, the head may sometimes be lighter, and the pronotum and mesothorax may share similar colours. The mesosomal setae (as in hair found on the mesosoma) are dark and sometimes translucent. The iridescence between the compound eyes and the lateral portion of the head ranges from slightly purple to strong and dark purple. The colour of the legs and coxae (the basal segment of the insect leg, which attaches to the body) are darker than the mesothorax, and the petiole (narrow waist) is reddish brown and also darker than the mesothorax.

The lateral portion of the second gastral tergite (a dorsal segment other than the head) is shiny, and the iridescence varies among workers, from green or blue to plain green and purple. The soft hairs on the head are frequent around the occipital margin, and around the mandibular insertion, three to eight pale setae are usually seen. The soft hairs are also common around the first gastral tergite. Examined specimens show no known ocelli. Erect setae on the pronotum are abundant. The anterodorsal (meaning in front and toward the back) portion of the propodeum is arched and flat.

There are no allometric differences among workers. On average, workers measure around 6–7 mm (0.24–0.28 in); this character distinguishes these ants from queens, as well as the different variety of colours they exhibit on their bodies. The head and pronotum range from orange to brick-red, and the mesonotum and propodeum are either light, same in colour or darker than the head. The gaster can be brown or black with blue or purple iridescence and the legs are either orange or brown. The iridescence around the foreparts is blue, pink, pale greenish yellow and purple. The erect setae are brown. The head has a concave posterior margin (as in the end of an organism from its head) with erect setae abundant in front of the face. The sides of the head are convex.

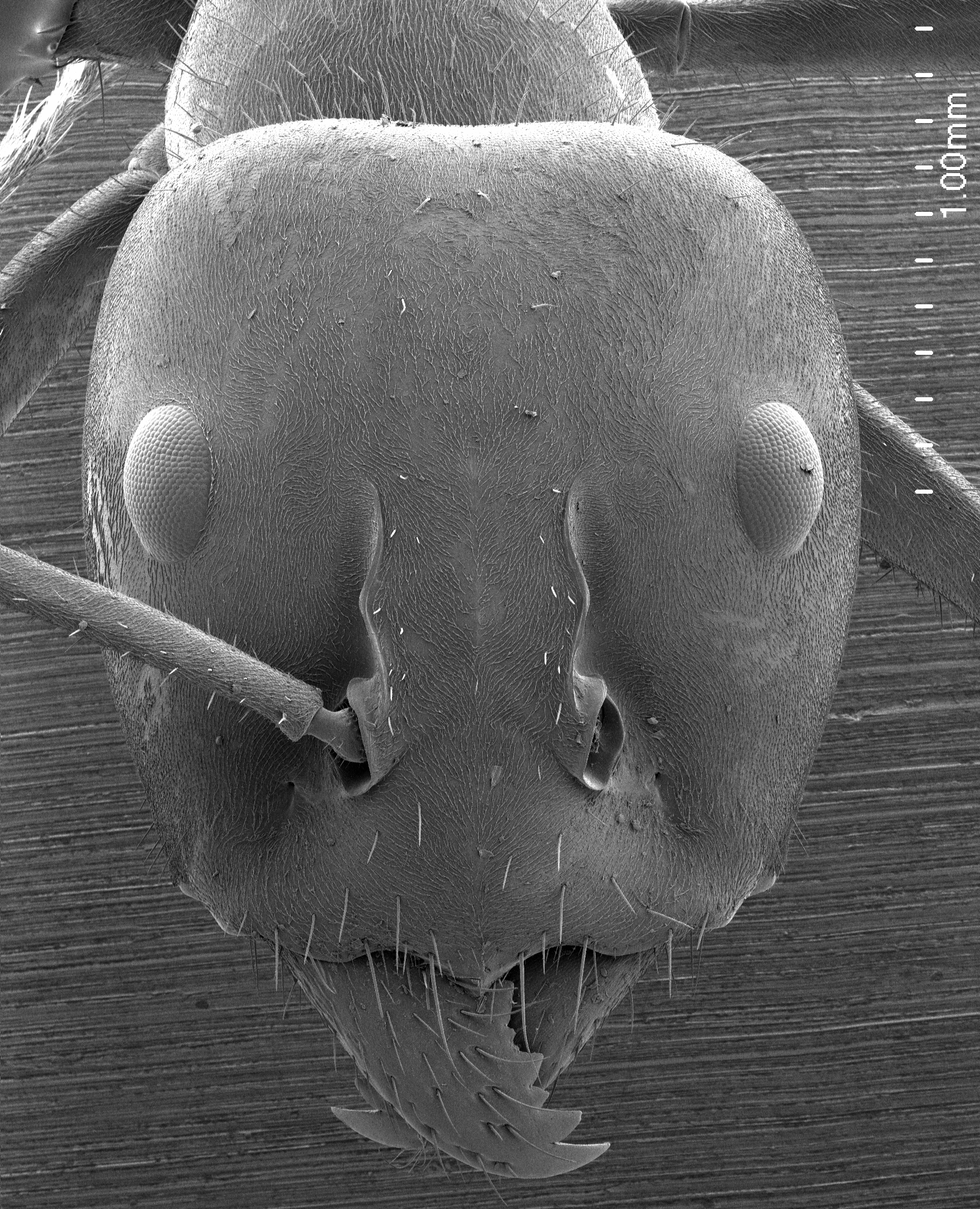
Facial profile using electron microscopy

Fully erect setae on the genal (side region of the head) are either present or absent, although a small number of setae may be seen around the mandibular insertion. The eyes are semicircular and positioned around the midpoint of the ants' head capsule. The frontal carinae (a keel-shaped ridge or structure) are convex and the antennal scapes extend beyond the head's posterior margin by two or three times the diameter. Erect setae are found all over the antennal scape and noticeably prominent on the clypeal margin (a shield-like plate at the front of an insect). The mandibles are elongated and triangular, with long curved setae around the head capsule.

The pronotum is evenly curved with at least 12 or more pronotal setae present. These setae are mostly short and bristly. The mesonotum is sinuous (meaning it has many curves), and, like the pronotum, has 12 or more mesonotal setae. The mesothoracic spiracles are very small and the propodeal dorsum is smooth or convex. There are also a number of propodeal setae. The dorsum of the node (a segment between the mesosoma and gaster) is thin, scale-like and sometimes vertical. There are both non-marginal and marginal setae present on the first gastral tergite around the gaster.

Queens are easily distinguishable from workers by their black colour and larger size, measuring 12.7 mm (0.50 in). Queens are black, being mostly dark. The antennae and legs are ferruginous (rust-like colour), the head is fusco-ferruginous, and the sides beneath the face and mandibles are ferruginous. The head is wider than the thorax and emarginate. There is an impressed line that runs from the anterior (nearer to the front of the body) stemma to the base of the clypeus. The thorax is ovate (has an oval-shaped outline) and thinly covered with short reddish brown pubescence (soft short hair). The wings are subhyaline, exhibiting a glassy appearance. The wings are yellowish along the anterior margin of the superior pair and also around the base; the nervures (the veins of the wings) are rufo-fuscous.

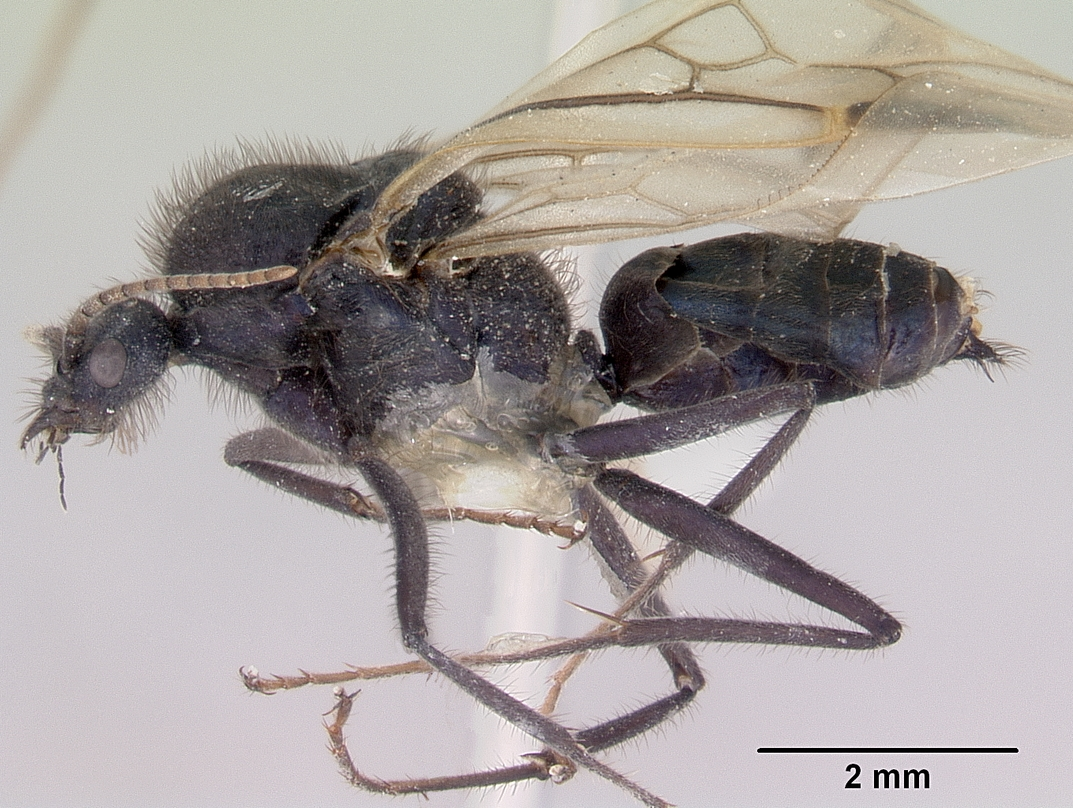
Male specimen

Like the thorax, the abdomen is ovate and several abdominal segments appear rufo-piceous, making it reddish-brown or glossy brownish black. Males are smaller than queens, measuring 8 mm (0.31 in). Males are bright violet, and the antennae (except for the first joint) and tarsi are ferruginous. The first pair of the legs look almost ferruginous, and the head, legs and thorax are covered with black pubescence. Like the queen, the wings are subhyaline (imperfectly hyaline) and the nervures are rufo-fuscous. The abdomen shows a bright green tinge when seen under certain light.

Larvae measure 2.7–2.9 mm (0.11–0.11 in). The body is stout-shaped and the dorsal side is longer whereas the ventral side (the bottom portion of the body) is shorter and more straight. The head and anus are ventral. The integument is covered in spinules that are either isolated from each other or in short rows on the posterior somite and on the ventral surface. The body hairs are very short, measuring 0.008–0.016 mm (0.00031–0.00063 in). The cranium on its dorsal side outlines a curve which is smooth, and the spinules are moderately large. These spinules are either isolated or seen in near parallel rows. Several head hairs are present but they are small at 0.013–0.025 mm (0.00051–0.00098 in) in length.

The labrum is narrow and bilobed (consisting of two lobes). Each lobe has spinules and three sensilla (simple sensory receptors) around the anterior surface. The ventral border only has two sensilla and a number of spinules, and on the posterior surface, there are several rows of spinules and three sensilla. The mandibles have a central apical (most distal plate or appendage from the body) tooth which is clearly noticeable and sharp. The maxillae have lobes, and the labial palps (sensory structures on the labium) are knob-shaped.

Meat ant workers may be confused with those of I. lividus, as the two appear similar and are grouped in the same species complex. I. lividus and the much more localised I. spadius can be distinguished from other members of the I. purpureus group by the shape of the pronotum. Aside from colour differentiation that was a key morphological character to distinguish I. purpureus and the synonym I. greensladei from each other, some meat ant populations exhibit polymorphism despite being monomorphic (occurs in a particular form); specifically, body size among meat ants may vary geographically. For example, those that are found in very hot regions tend to be larger, whereas those found in regions of high humidity tend to be smaller than average.

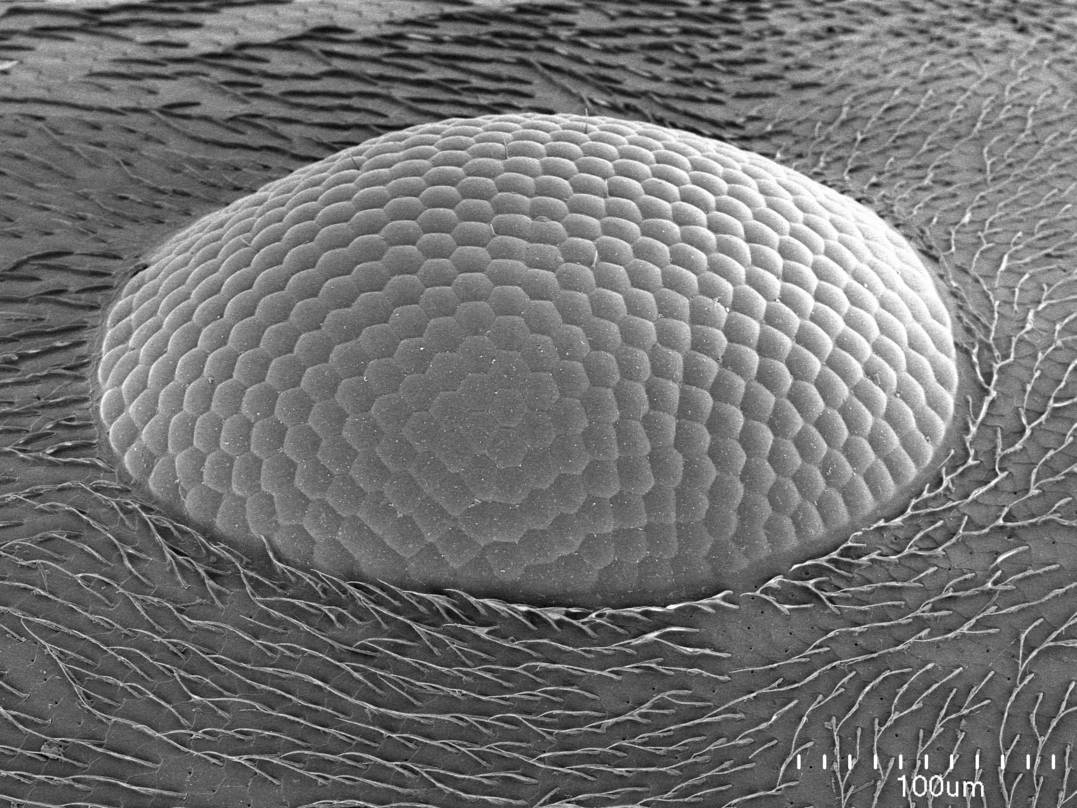
Microscopic view of an eye

Examined workers once referred to as I. greensladei from southwestern Western Australia have erect setae on the genae (lateral sclerites), whereas those studied elsewhere have glabrous genae, meaning that these areas have no hairs. Such patterns are most likely clinal, where several characteristics may gradually differentiate over a geographical area. The colour of the setae throughout the body and the iridescence may vary geographically. For example, populations restricted to the coasts of Western Australia usually have pale setae, compared to most colonies throughout the country, which have the common blackish setae. In 1993, Shattuck could not separate populations with pale setae when other key diagnostic traits that would separate these populations were not considered.

Meat ants from the Western Australian wheatbelt and goldfields show different iridescence; the iridescence in some collected specimens ranged from pale greenish-blue to yellowish-green, especially around the humeri (a structure which forms the basal corner of an insect's wing or wing case) and frons. The variation of the iridescence is, however, a consistent pattern found in other Iridomyrmex species with little distinction, making it a subtle character. The colour variation is less marked in all collected specimens of I. purpureus, as well as its close relative I. viridiaeneus, which is found in dry regions around the south-western regions. Shattuck further notes that populations found throughout the Northern Territory and South Australia have reduced pubescence on the first gastral tergite, but this is different elsewhere.

== Distribution and habitat ==
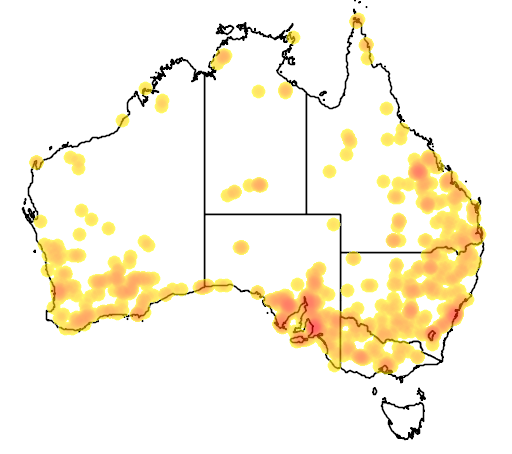
Atlas of Living Australia

The meat ant is one of the best-known species of ant endemic to Australia; it has an enormous geographical range, covering at least one-third of the continent. Its range spans 4,000 kilometres (2,500 mi) from east to west, and 3,000 kilometres (1,900 mi) from north to south. This extensive range has allowed the meat ant to form large nesting grounds in areas where no development has occurred, and large amounts of gravel and open space have led to an abundant supply of materials (i.e. pebbles and dead pieces of vegetation) used to construct nests. The ant is particularly dominant and frequently seen across the coastal and inland regions of southeastern Australia. Based on examined material, meat ants are widespread throughout New South Wales, the Australian Capital Territory and Victoria. In Queensland, they are frequently encountered in the eastern regions, whereas their abundance is limited around the north and central parts. The ants are common in the southwestern regions of Western Australia, though not in the north. However, the Division of Entomology of the CSIRO states that the ant's presence in the state has not been verified. Most specimens collected in South Australia are from the south-east, but some populations are known in the north-west and northeast regions of the state. In the Northern Territory, specimens have been collected in the north and south regions but compared to other jurisdictions the ant is uncommon. No specimens have been collected from Tasmania or any outlying islands surrounding Australia.

Meat ants thrive in varied habitats, especially where it is open and warm. These ants are adapted to and thrive in warm climates and areas with constant high temperatures. The meat ant shares its distribution with many other animals and insects, some of which may cause harm to the ant or rival it, such as the banded sugar ant (Camponotus consobrinus). Nests are seen in box-pine scrubs, Callitris forests, dry and wet sclerophyll woodland, eucalypt open woodland, in farm pastures, flat savannah woodland, mallee woodland, heath, mulga, riparian woodland, around roads and cracks in sidewalks, and urban areas such as urban gardens and parkland. Nests are also common in lateritic ridges, granite outcrops and clay formations. Meat ants are able to survive in dry areas if there is a rich supply of water and food resources (such as honeydew and arthropod prey), especially along river banks, station properties and irrigated areas. Meat ants typically occur at altitudes of 5 and 1,170 m (16 and 3,839 ft) above sea level, though at times they can be found at heights of 915 m (3,002 ft). Those that are found at these altitudes are always associated with Eucalyptus rubida, and colonies situated in eastern New South Wales tend to nest near E. melliodora and E. blakelyi. In the south coast of New South Wales, meat ants are mainly found in heath shrubland, but are absent from heavily timbered slopes and cannot build nests in quartz. Other areas where the ants do not occur include dense pastures, dense bushes, tropical rainforests and treeless areas. For example, the Canberra suburb of Turner was constructed on subterranean clover pasture, which meat ants do not nest around. Their populations would later flourish and nests became numerous around houses after shrubs and trees were planted.

=== Nests ===
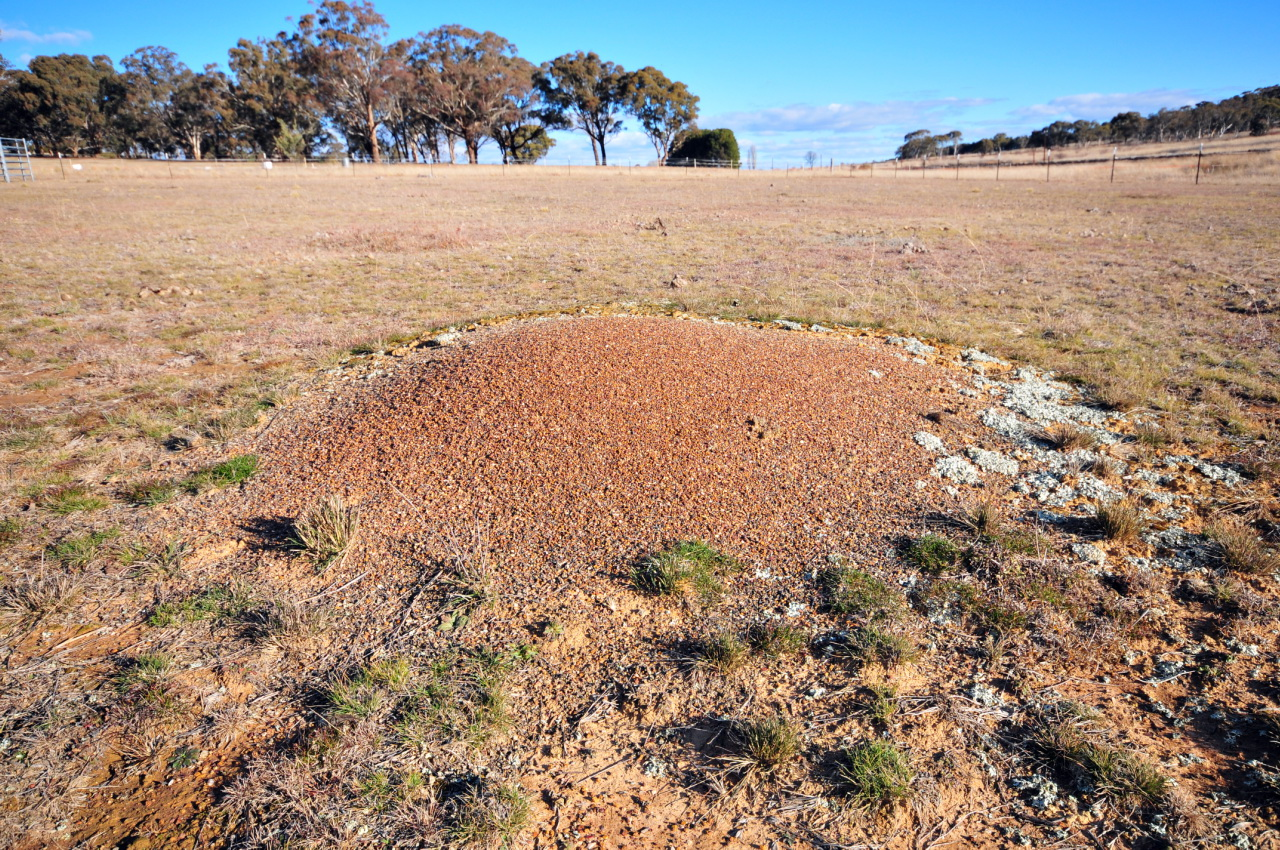
Near Bungendore

Meat ants are well known for their large, oval-shaped nest-mounds (normally 1 or 2 metres (3.3 or 6.6 ft) in diameter) that are encountered in areas of occurrence, and obvious to identify. These nests are often associated with many entrance holes; most nests have 20 to 35 holes. On the surface on the nest, workers clear the area of vegetation and cover the mound with gravel, but may use other materials that are available, including sand, pebbles, dead vegetation, eucalyptus fruits and twig fragments. Nests are built in the sun and hardly in the shade to keep them warm. The ant is a polydomous species, meaning that they live in more than one nest. Some colonies are known to create "super-nests": workers construct many nests connected through established paths, extending up to 650 metres (2,130 ft) in length. In one extreme case, a single colony was found to occupy over 10 hectares (25 acres) of land with 85 individual nests and 1,500 entrance holes. While they show no aggression toward their own nest mates, meat ants are aggressive to occupants of different nests within the same colony. Polydomy within a colony is typically favoured as it improves access to forage, as workers deliver most of their food to the nest that is closest to any site they forage in.

At any size, a meat ant nest always has a possibility of dying out in any year, but the site may be reoccupied by another colony. Hence, nests can be very old as suggested in one study. Some nests may never be reoccupied for unknown reasons. The regrowth of vegetation which shades the nest, soil damage or even a disease may wipe out a colony and leave the nest site completely abandoned. The death of a colony may be obvious when competing colonies increase in population and size by expanding their territories with well-established satellite nests in order to exploit the food sources once used by a former colony. Satellite nests may diverge from their parent nests to become independent, as suggested by the antagonism of worker ants from different nests or when others are uninhabitable by insecticide treatment. After the eradication of a nest, satellite nests emerge nearby, and may sever their connections with the parent nest. The separation of a satellite nest is an effective way for a nest to exploit food sources, and a colony with less than 11 entrance holes is recognised as non-mature (a nest is mature at 12). As most satellite nests have 11 holes and accept a queen of their own, a satellite nest may easily develop maturity in one year.

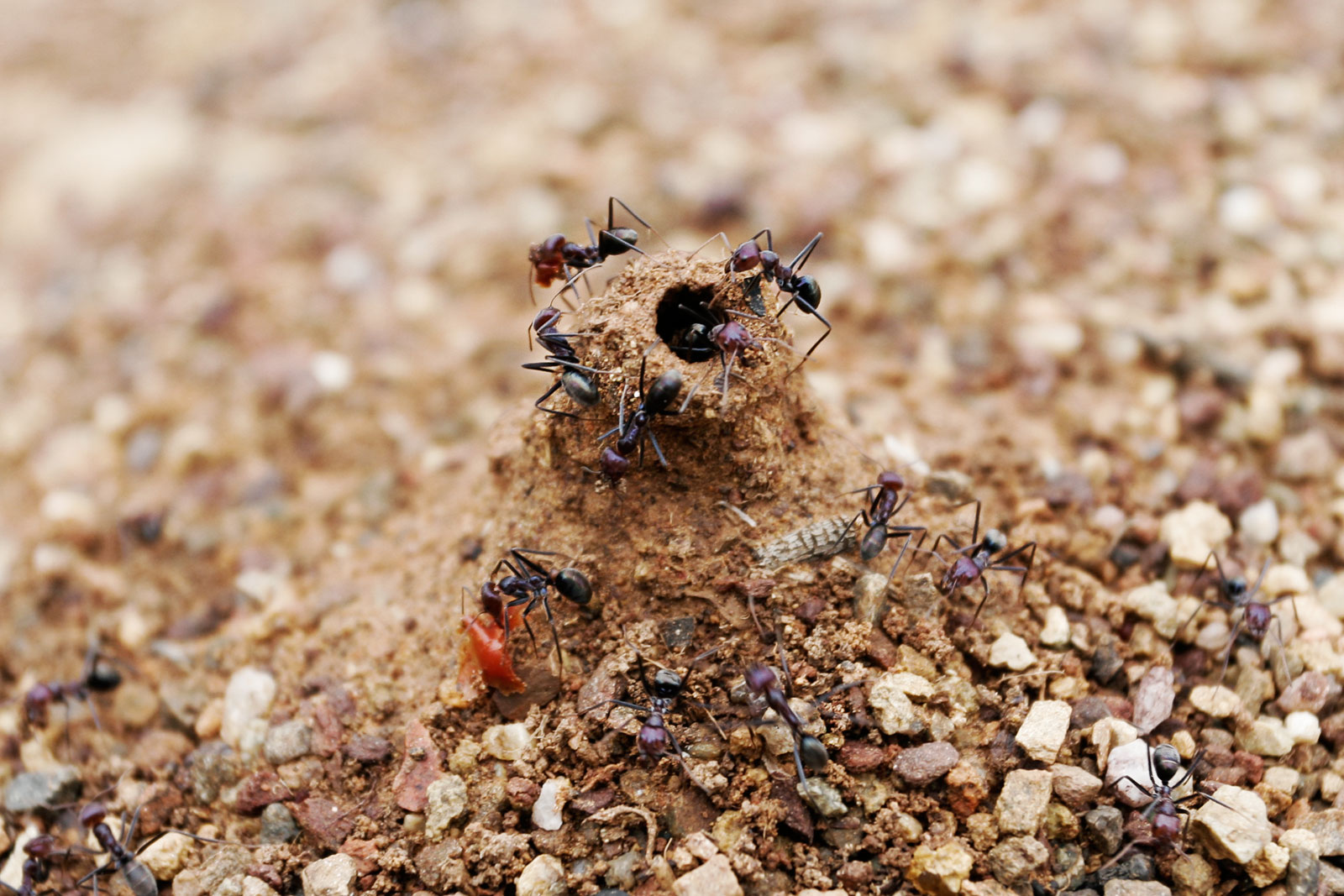
These mound holes prevent water from entering the nest during rain.

All entrance holes of a given nest lead into a separate set of galleries. Entrance holes tend to be very small with only enough space for a single worker to fit through, but others may be 1 centimetre (0.4 in) wide. Beneath the surface, there are widened circular vertical shafts which are 1.5 centimetres (0.6 in) wide. Below these shafts, the tunnels turn into irregular galleries with paths going outward and downward which form more galleries. Almost all of these galleries are clustered together 15 to 20 centimetres (5.9 to 7.9 in) beneath the soil, which is extensively reworked by worker ants in the area above the nest. These sets of galleries are isolated from others connecting to neighbouring holes, although some may come close. However, there is no known physical connection. Each gallery has a flat floor, a domed roof and is irregularly oval-shaped. A gallery is typically 1.5 centimetres (0.6 in) high and 5 to 7 centimetres (2.0 to 2.8 in) wide. Below the galleries are a small number of shafts in undisturbed soil with large, yet scattered chambers where the population remains during the winter. In the upper areas of the colony, the galleries and shafts only account for 7–10% of nest space. For example, the galleries of excavated colonies occupy 420 cubic centimetres (26 cu in) whereas the total volume is around 5,000 cubic centimetres (310 cu in). Overall, a nest may dwell extremely deep beneath the soil as excavated nests are as deep as 3 metres (9.8 ft).

== Behaviour and ecology ==
=== Foraging and dominance ===
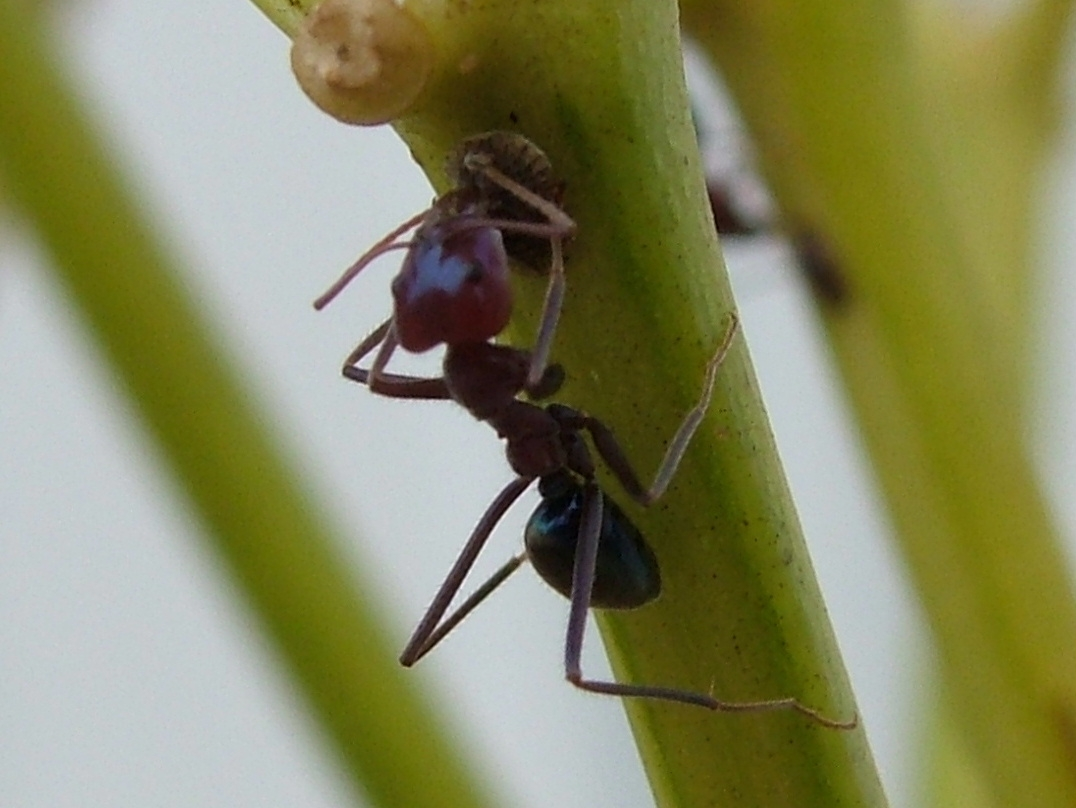
Worker foraging on vegetation

A diurnal species (active mainly during the day), the meat ant shows minimal interaction with nocturnal ant species when their territories overlap. The meat ant and other members of the I. purpureus species group are regarded as a dominant group of diurnal species in Australia, as they are highly active, aggressive, and have an enormous geographical range. During the day, the bulk of the workers attend and feed on honeydew secreted by insects that live on the leaves of Eucalyptus trees. These trees are connected by foraging trails formed by meat ants, which also connect to satellite nests that are a part of a single colony; these trails are easily visible due to the absence of vegetation and lead to important food and water sources. Other workers in smaller numbers will often scavenge around the nest area for dead insects, or other proteinaceous foods to bring back to their colony. Their dominance is clear when meat ants are capable of finding food sources more successfully than most ants, capable of displacing many ants and other insects. Food sources are also discovered more rapidly and greatly reduces the foraging efficiency of other ants, including those of Iridomyrmex. However, some ants such as the green-head ant (Rhytidoponera metallica) are not affected by the presence of meat ants and are still successful in finding food sources. As green-head ants are general predators and forage singularly and cannot recruit other nestmates, they are unable to defend food sources from dominant ants. They heavily rely on any food source and the impossibility of successfully defending it from other ants may have led to its peaceful coexistence with dominant species, including meat ants. This means green-head ants avoid conflict with meat ants. Certain myrmicines, which are highly competitive, are capable of defending themselves from foraging workers; the rapid recruitment of nestmates and the use of chemicals for defence allows them to withstand attacks from meat ants. In particular, Monomorium ants have been observed occupying baits regardless of the presence or absence of the meat ant. This is not the case with mealworms, but they have moderate success with honey baits. In foraging areas where meat ants are excluded or not present, the number of other ants observed is far greater and activity dramatically increases. However, the presence of meats ants does not affect abundant species, and most of the time it is only Iridomyrmex ants that increase their foraging rate.

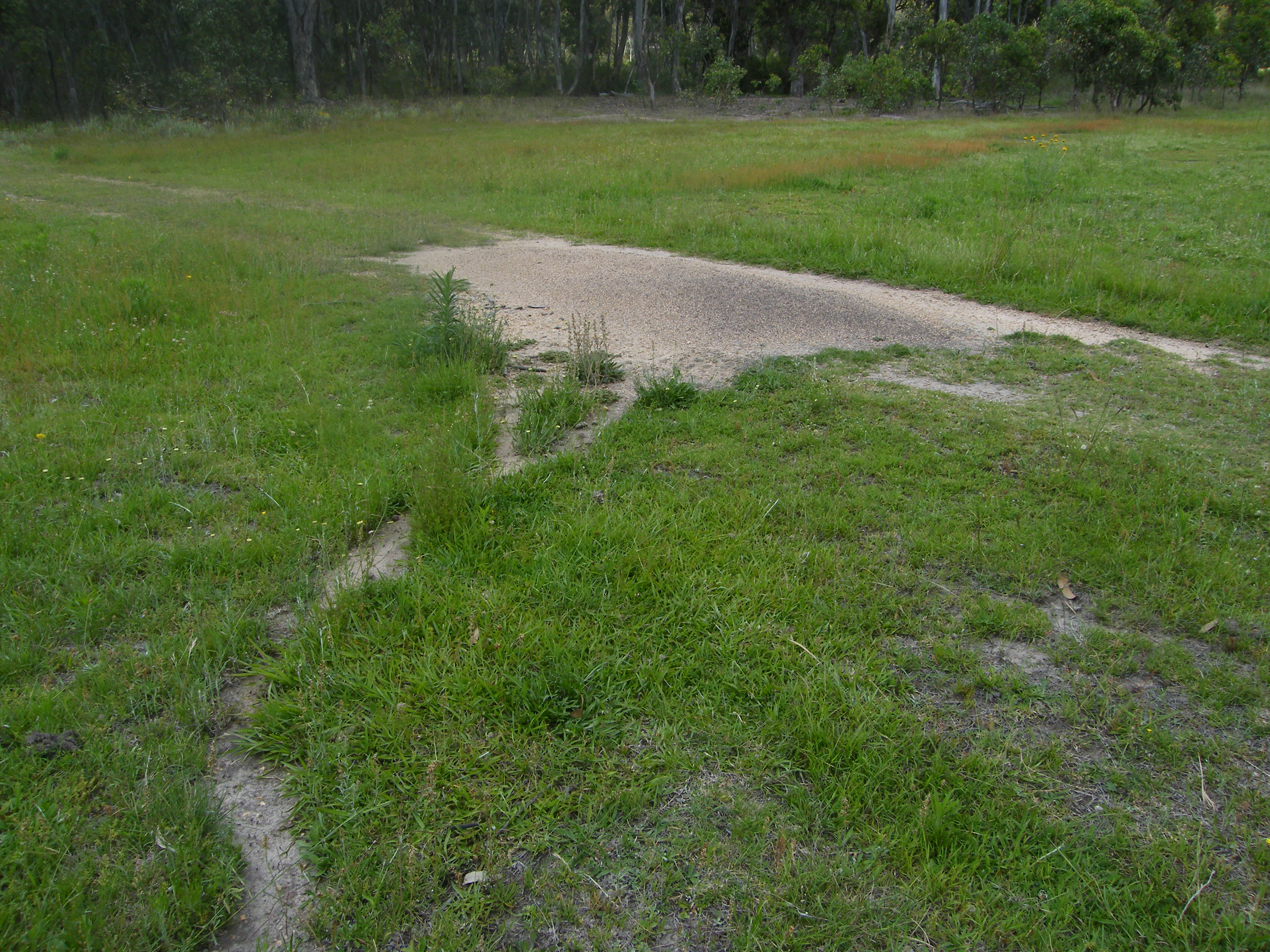
Foraging trail leading to a nest

The impact of meat ants on other species varies, depending on the habitat and type of food source, and the ecological role the ant plays. The deliberate exclusion of meat ants show that not only can they alter the amount of sources available, but the dynamics of resource use on entire outcrops. If present, meat ants rely on rapidly discovering food sources and retain their dominance so other ants cannot collect them, as well as exploitation and interference which helps displace other ants. The habitat meat ants live in may affect their dominance among the fauna. They are less successful in complex habitats and more successful in open areas, allowing workers to forage efficiently; for example, workers forage around rocks and collect food sources more successfully in contrast to those in vegetation. Meat ants are even more dominant than other I. purpureus species group members in non-complex habitats. Meat ants are normally larger than other Iridomyrmex species and can displace or even kill those trying to compete for food sources. The similar behaviours among meat ants and certain Iridomyrmex species have increased the level of conflict among each other, especially those in open habitats.

The rate of movement of workers is associated with temperature, and foraging workers leave the nest after sunrise when the nest is warmed in the early morning. Meat ants emerge and start foraging when temperatures are approximately 14 °C (57 °F), but they are capable of withstanding extremely hot temperatures, as workers have been seen foraging in 43 °C (109 °F) heat. Workers may only forage for several minutes when soil temperature is well above their thermal limit at 45.8 °C (114.4 °F)). At 50 °C (122 °F) soil surface temperature, foraging activity is reduced even further. As these ants exhibit high running speeds during hot days, their speed decreases after temperatures of 50 °C (122 °F) due to the physiological stress put onto them. Workers can withstand such temperatures by exhibiting opportunistic thermal responses to adjust their behaviour in order to handle high trail temperatures and alter their thermal biology for low temperatures. They will also deliberately expose themselves closely to their thermal maxima.

The success of meat ants depends on what resource they are dealing with. In one study, the removal of meat ants allowed the successful foraging of Iridomyrmex ants at carbohydrate sources, but not for protein baits. The success of the ants also did not increase with mealworm baits, suggesting that competition does not always occur between meat ants and other species, and factors, such as food preference, may be involved. In contrast with camponotines and some myrmicines, both of their success was affected at numerous food sources with meat ants present. Camponotines exhibit no aggression and cannot defend themselves.

=== Diet ===
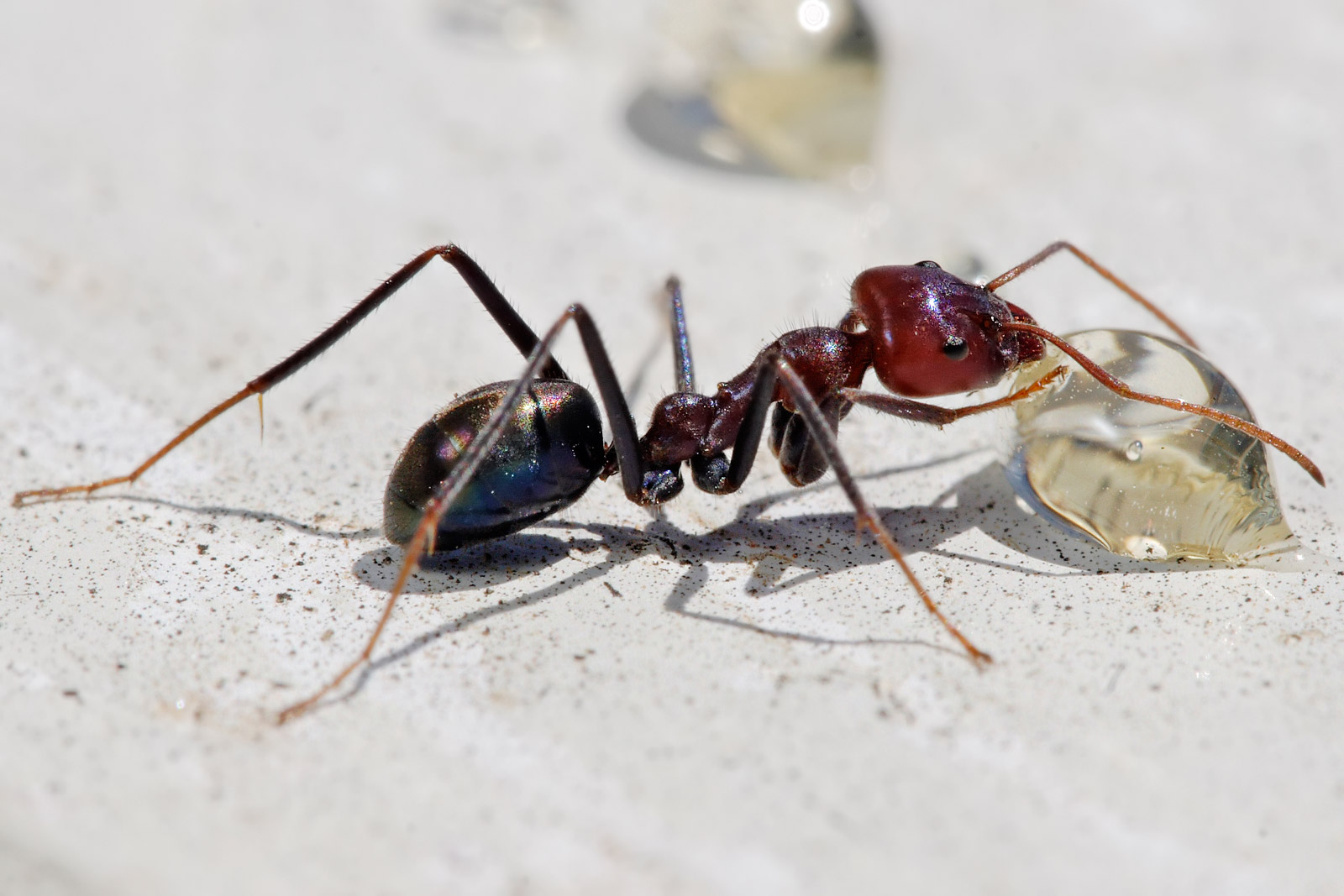
Worker feeding on honey

Like other Iridomyrmex species, the meat ant is an omnivore, retrieving food sources from various insects it tends, including caterpillars and various sorts of butterflies, particularly the larvae of the Waterhouse's hairstreak (Jalmenus lithochroa). Meat ants usually feed on honeydew from sap-sucking insects, flower nectar, sugar and other sweet substances. In captive colonies, workers prefer to consume small pieces of grapes rather than honey solutions and other sweet foods. These ants prey on various insects and animals, collecting both live and dead invertebrates and acquire meat from dead vertebrates. Insects the meat ants prey on include giant lacewings, which they swarm up trees to kill, the butterfly genoveva azure Ogyris genoveva, Indian mealmoths, almond moths, the Western Australian jarrah leafminer and the larvae of the wasp Trichogramma. Large and developed larvae of the cabbage butterfly (Pieris rapae) are attacked more effectively by meat ant workers than those of other Iridomyrmex species. On sandy beaches, this species is observed preying on the polychaete annelid worm, Armandia intermedia, causing high mortality rates on them (rates of 30 percent). These ants will feed on a number of dead or alive animals, including metamorphic crucifix toads, snakes, lizards, and birds. On some occasions, swarms of workers have been found on dead foxes. The meat ant is the only known ant in Australia that feeds on fresh guano. The collection of guano by a nearby meat ant colony shows the opportunistic nature of the species. Observations show that trails of workers in groups of two to four were found collecting the guano under an active bat roost within an abandoned mine and proceeded to return it to the nest. The collection of guano by any Australian ant colony was never recorded prior to these observations, but it is unknown why meat ants collect fresh guano.

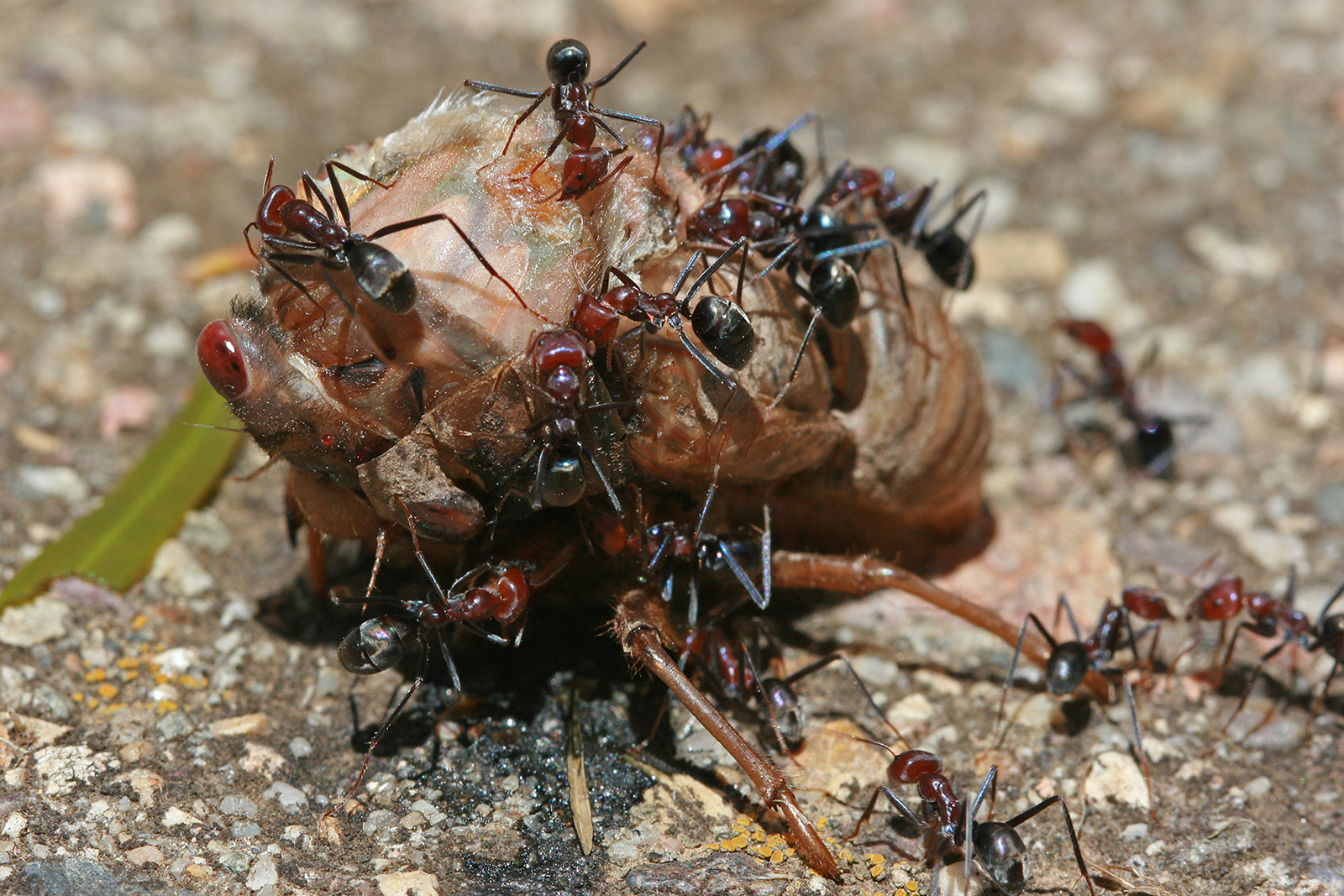
Cooperating to devour a cicada

Meat ants are among the very few native species of Australia that are not harmed by the toxins of the cane toad, an invasive species. Most of the time, foraging workers target metamorph toads. Observations show that workers would forage around ponds and seize any toadlet. This normally starts with a single worker making contact with an individual and tracing its movements, followed by three or four workers capturing it. All the participating ants would grab a limb and sever the legs, returning the prey item back to their nest. Most of the time these tactics do not work. For example, most toadlets are able to escape the ants by displaying aversion-like behaviour; an individual may escape by struggling erratically or forcing the ants to release their grip by returning to the water. This aversion behaviour leads to most toadlets remaining in the water or staying on objects such as water lilies, pieces of bark that the ants cannot access, or moving around on moist substrates. It is unknown if meat ant predation on the toadlets affected the population, but based on the population density of the toadlets within the studied site and the foraging time and efficiency, approximately 2,700 toadlets could be removed per day. As the toadlet population density is extremely high, the impact of meat ant predation is minor. However, the survivability of the toadlets may be affected if the ants prevent the toadlets from foraging into many areas of moist substrate.

Water is an important resource for colonies living in dry and arid environments, but sometimes it may not be available. To counter this, workers are able to extract a significant amount of water from the sand with 2%–4% water content and 4% from the soil. Meat ants are unable to retrieve as much water from the soil, whereas with sand they are able to attain a greater amount of water; however, the soil contains a wide variety of particles, including clay and coarse sand, which causes water to be bound firmly. Ants may retrieve it by digging or directly suck on the soil itself at a low metabolic cost. This may be an evolved response based on tested ants, but no observations show meat ants doing this. Meat ants are known to dig into moist soil to gain access to water or where water has been spilt, either if the site is nearby their nest or far away.

=== Life cycle and reproduction ===
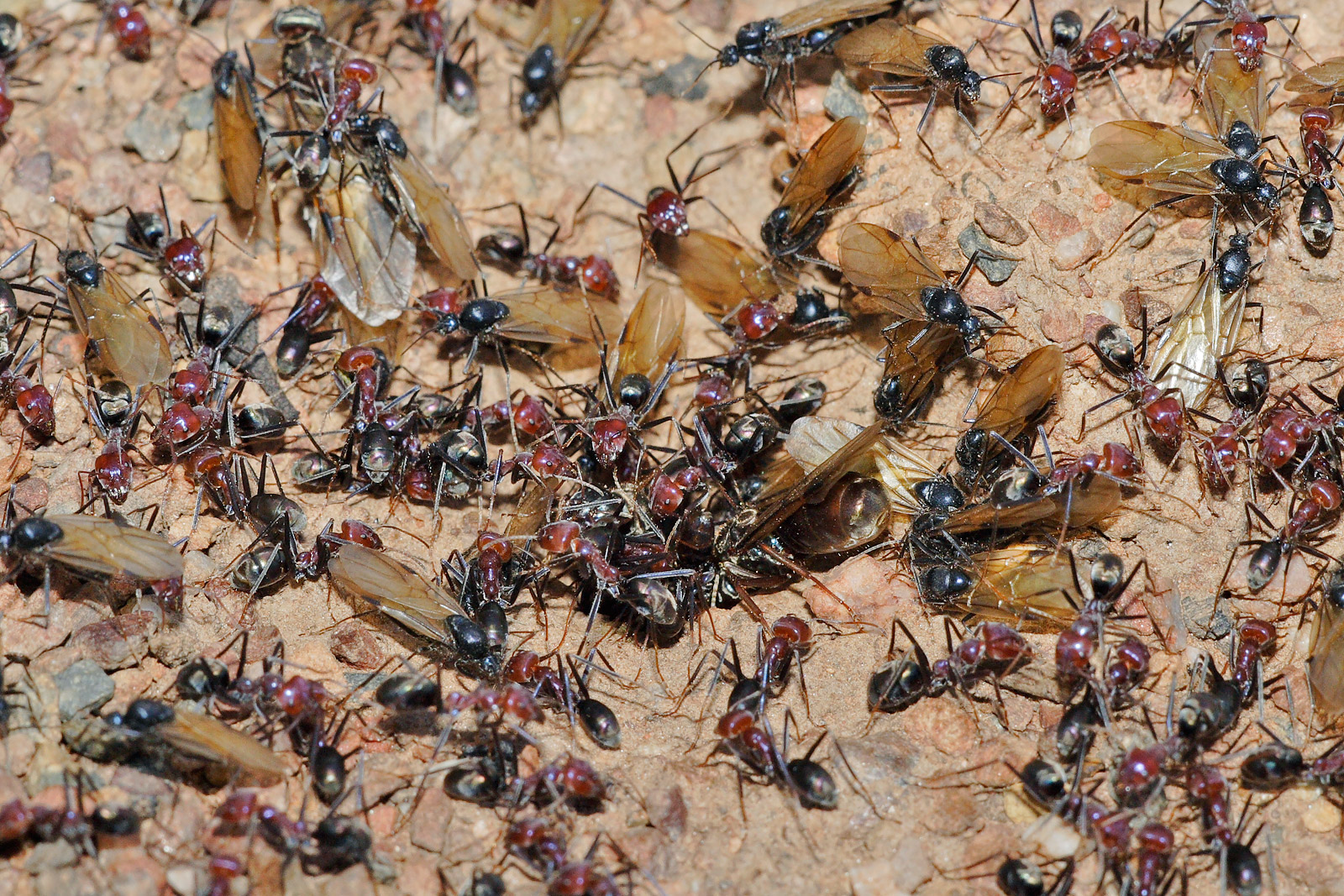
Alates swarming for nuptial flight

Nuptial flight usually occurs during spring, in October. Reproductive females only mate with a single male and begin establishing their own colonies afterwards. Nuptial flight occurs after rain, where the males emerge from their nest first, followed by the virgin queens; groups of 20 to 40 females emerge after the males have flown away. The alates (the reproductive males and females) position themselves on top of the nest in order to heat themselves, and all fly at the same time once they are warm. This process may happen multiple times unless the weather had changed, otherwise, the queens would return to their nest. Nuptial flight may continue for days until all virgin queens have withdrawn from the nest. Most of the time, a single queen will start her own colony and lay eggs that will take around 44 to 61 days to fully develop and emerge as adults, but colonies can also be founded through multiple queens cooperating with each other (around 10% of founding colonies have two queens present) or "budding" (also called "satelliting" or "fractionating"), where a subset of the colony including queens, workers and brood (eggs, larvae and pupae) leave the main colony for an alternative nest site. Newly mated queens sometimes seek adoption into existing colonies if the chances of successfully establishing their own colonies are low - this can occur under certain conditions such as habitat saturation or nest-site limitations. Many queens are killed during colony founding; major aspects include predation by birds and other ants, even those of the same species, due to the fact they attempt to establish their nests near large colonies. However, some queens are successful, sometimes with the assistance of neighbouring workers, who help the queen dig some chambers. Other causes of queen deaths include disease and starvation. A queen's ovaries may take four weeks to mature, and she lays around 20 eggs that may develop into larvae in less than a month. Workers have been observed laying eggs, presumably trophic eggs. The function of these unfertilised eggs are nutritional, not reproduction.

The number of individuals in a colony varies. A mature nest of several years old can hold between 11,000 and 64,000 ants, while other colonies can house around 300,000. In some cases, enormous colonies can have as many as a million ants. Observed colonies are known to contain nearly 70,000 larvae and 64,000 workers; some can have 20,000 males and over 1,000 virgin queens, but others may have more virgin queens than males. The ratio of worker ants to the number of the larvae in colonies ranges from one worker for every two larvae or two larvae for every worker. The population of a nest can be affected or altered by several factors: human interference can severely damage or completely destroy nests which potentially devastates the nest population, and overshadowing is the main cause of a nest's demise. As well as that, neighbouring nests may increase in population if damaged or abandoned sites are taken over. Meat ants also rely on their nests to withstand climatic stress in summer and winter, as foraging activity and food sources are sometimes limited in summer and in winter, workers are unable to survive cold temperatures. As a result, meat ants overwinter, which is a process where some organisms wait out the winter season due to cold conditions making everyday activity and survivability almost impossible; populations may be affected greatly.

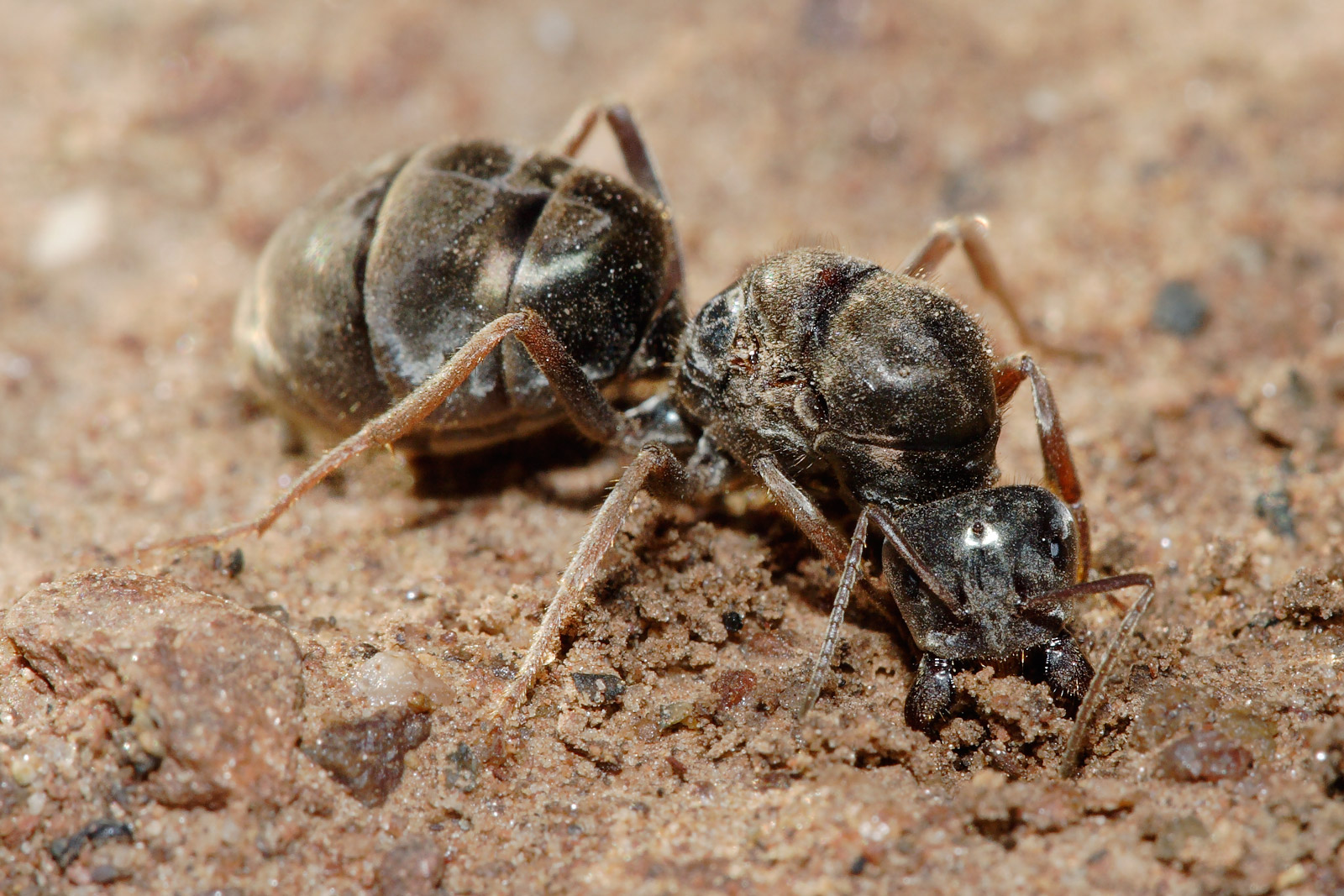
Queen burrowing a hole after her nuptial flight

Most colonies are monogyne, meaning that a colony only has a single queen, but based on observations, some nests contain more than a single queen. Some nests are known to contain two queens, with some even having as many as four in a single colony, making them polygynous; a high proportion of queens living in polygynous nests are unrelated to one another. Some colonies are oligogynous, which means that multiple queens are present in a colony, but they are tolerated by all workers birthed from different queens and treated equally. Tolerance still occurs even when new reproductive females and males are born, but recognition based on kin from queens and workers is known, hinting brood discrimination when the larvae are fed or groomed; queens will only take care of their own brood and neglect to look after broods laid by other queens. The queens, on the other hand, will only cooperate with each other during nest founding, but will be antagonistic once there are workers present in the colony. Queens become more intolerant of each other as the colony grows, and eventually separate within the nest, resulting in the queen laying more eggs. Such cases usually happen when pleometrotic founding occurs, or if a queen ant is adopted by a colony, setting up aggressive relationships. Physical fights between queens in the same colony are rare.

As most meat ant colonies rarely have a second queen, polydomy is not always associated with polygyny, although the two are frequently associated with each other because polygynous colonies reproduce by budding. This means that the ecological factors that promote polydomy and polygny both differ. Studies show that most meat ants are produced by a single, inseminated queen due to the high level of relatedness in all but one tested colonies. Colonies that are not closely related are the result of colony fusion (meaning that two unrelated and separate colonies form a single entity). Meat ants also show nest fidelity: in polydomous colonies, workers from different nests will always mingle with others from different nests but never return to a nest they do not originate from. Instead, they return to the nest they enclosed in. This means that colonies may only homogenise through brood transfer. Nestmates from different nests will always be aggressive towards each other, but this is due to a number of factors: genetic and spatial distance in nests can correlate with the level of aggression exhibited by the ants. However, they exhibit more aggression to ants of different species from adjoining territories. They are also aggressive to conspecific ants from distant colonies, suggesting that environmental cues play a vital role in nestmate recognition. An example is that background odours in a particular environment may impair ants from identifying their own nestmates, and may need to make more attempts to determine an ant's identity.

=== Predators ===
Despite their dominance among ants, a number of animals are known to prey on meat ants. The short-beaked echidna (Tachyglossus aculeatus) is a prominent predator of the meat ant, mostly due to the high fat levels in virgin queens: These queens can contain almost 47% fat, and when no queens are available after an attack, an echidna may stop attacking the nest. However, these ants are normally consumed either in low numbers or avoided entirely. Attacking echidnas burrow down into the hole they have made and consume them while handling the bites from the ants, as they frequently scratch themselves on the head and chest. The echidna does not consume meat ants throughout the whole year; instead, echidnas only attack meat ant nests from August to October, which is when nuptial flight (meaning that virgin queens and males emerge to mate) occurs. This time period makes it much easier for echidnas to prey on the winged females since they are directly above on the nest. Despite attacks, colony growth is not affected by echidnas.

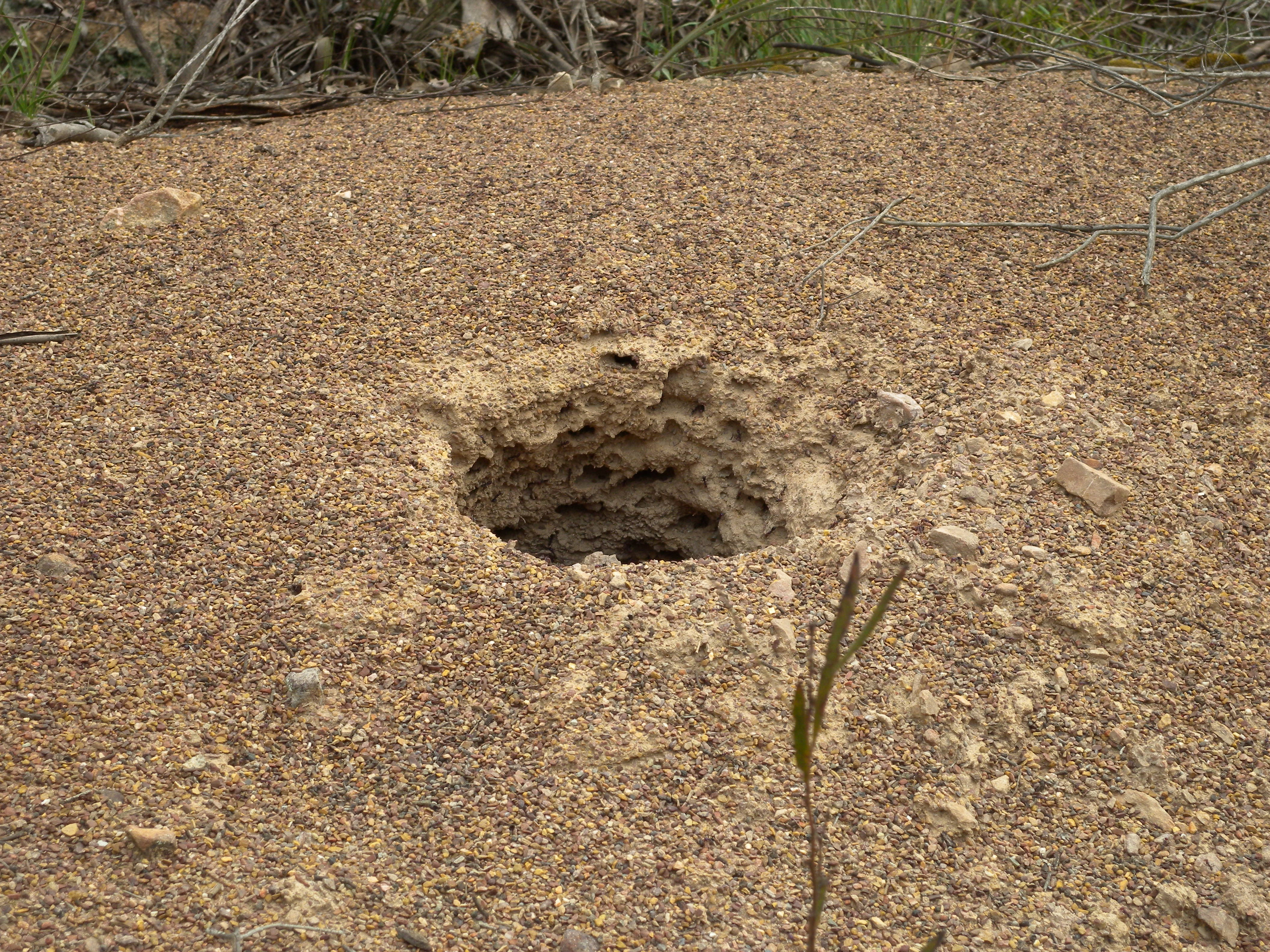
Nest damage from a feeding echidna

Several birds prey on meat ants. The masked woodswallow (A. personatus) and the white-browed woodswallow (Artamus superciliosus) will gather around meat ant nests and swoop at them, catching several ants before eating them. Pieces of meat ants have been found in the faeces of the red-capped robin (Petroica goodenovii), rufous whistler (Pachycephala rufiventris), hooded robin (Melanodryas cucullata) and the red-browed treecreeper (Climacteris erythrops). Meat ants that forage on Ventilago viminalis trees are often eaten by the apostlebird. Some large ground-feeding birds, such as currawongs, magpies and ravens dig out newly established colonies after a queen has found a suitable spot to nest. Small domes of excavated soil are present at such spots, revealing the queens' presence to these birds. As a result, many queens are consumed by birds, leaving many abandoned nest chambers.

The blind snake Ramphotyphlops nigrescens follow trails laid by meat ants to locate them, and the snakes are also known to feed on the brood. Various species of spiders prefer to prey on meat ants, mainly attracted by the alarm pheromone the ants release. One spider, in particular, the cursorial spider Habronestes bradleyi, is a specialist predator against these ants and uses their alarm pheromones that are released during territorial disputes to locate them. These alarm signals are created by oscillating the body along the longitudinal axis, which are mostly released when an ant encounters a nest mate.

Cyclotorna monocentra moths feed on meat ant broods. The larvae of these moths are parasites to leafhoppers and will move to meat ant colonies to complete their development, where they will proceed to consume the brood; the females lay many eggs near ant trails which are close to the leafhoppers tended by ants. Other observations show that the Iphierga macarista larvae are scavengers in meat ant nests, while Sphallomorpha beetles live in burrows near nests of meat ants, where the larvae capture and prey on workers passing by. The larvae of the spitfire sawfly and Pseudoperga guerini are able to regurgitate a fluid against the meat ant if they are getting attacked by them; depending on how much is regurgitated, an ant will either walk away and clean itself or become fatally affected by it. Lizards such as the thorny dragon, which is a sit and wait predator, consume meat ants, but other lizards which eat Iridomyrmex ants usually reject this species.

=== Ritualised fighting ===
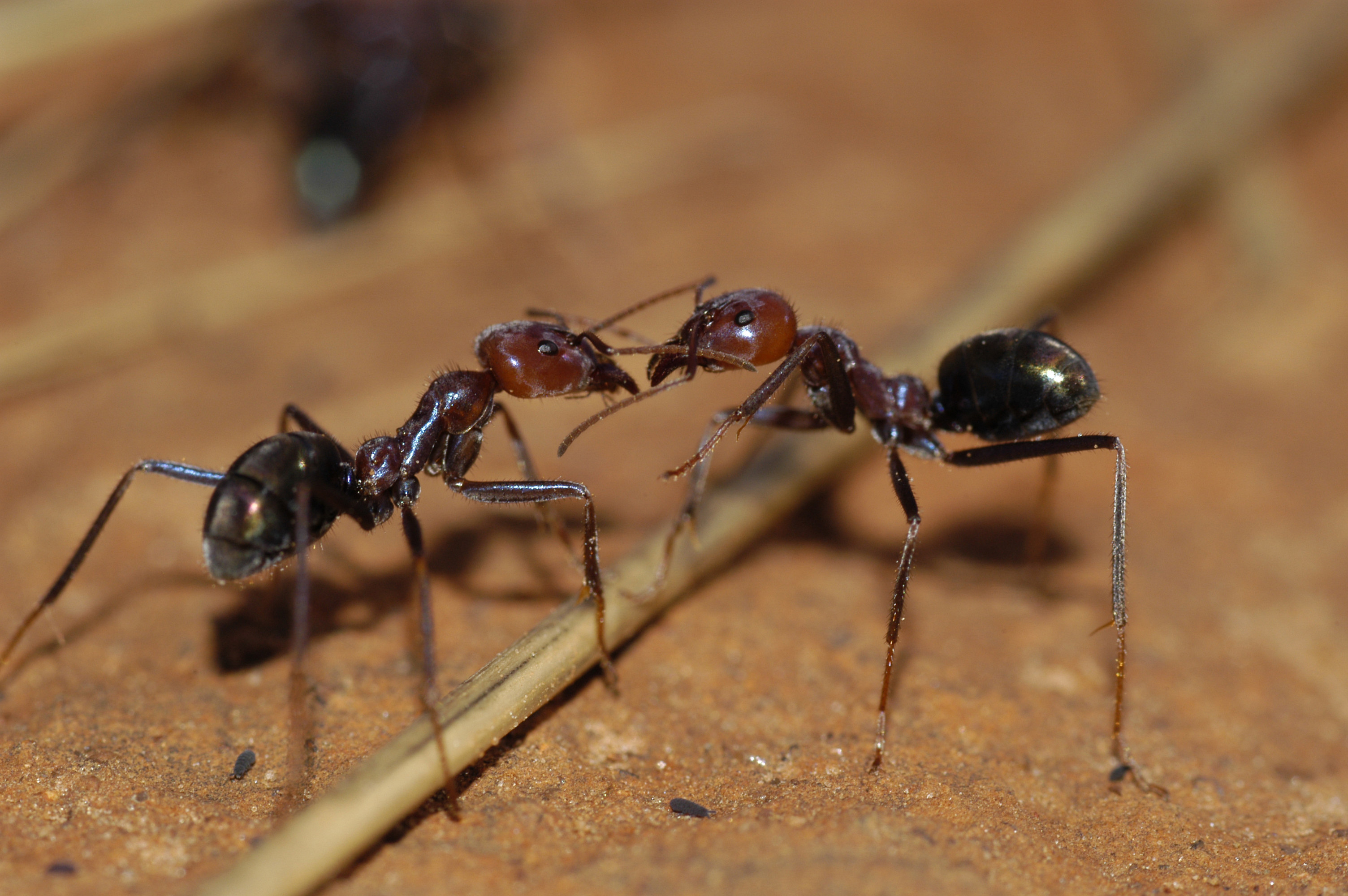
Two workers, ritualised fighting

Meat ants are highly territorial and aggressive ants which establish firm borders between neighbouring colonies. While the boundaries are not physical, worker ants maintain them by engaging in ritualised fighting with opponent ants, an interaction most colonies engage in. Fatalities are rare on both sides, but fights may cause injuries to several workers. This fighting enables territory to be contested between opposing colonies without them killing each other and costing many casualties on both sides. Because of this, it is a method of avoiding casualties and promotes intercolony communication and assessment. A drainage of the work force would occur if these boundaries acted as a conflict zone if ritualised fighting did not take place. Lethal fighting only occurs if the colony is under attack.

Encounters between workers last for 15 seconds. Ritualised fighting only occurs with two worker ants who come into contact with each other, but if both ants are from the same colony, they break contact and groom themselves. Afterwards they walk around until they make contact with another ant. A meat ant detects a foreign worker by intense antennation (the act of touching with the antennae) and gaping of the mandibles, and stretch themselves upward to appear taller and larger, suggesting that meat ants will do this in a display of size-matching. Workers perform a behaviour known as "front leg boxing"; both workers have their front legs sweeping up and down, where it would flex at the coxal joint in a paddling motion. This paddling motion is aimed at each other during the fight, going on for three to five seconds on average. From this point on, this would determine who is a "loser" and who is the "winner".

The ant who lost the ritual fight will lower its body, and lean sideways from the victorious ant. The victorious ant will remain raised upward and reach down to the worker and open its mandibles wider, grasping on the opponent's mandibles, and then tug and shake its head slightly for a few moments. However, the fight may continue if neither worker backs down, and will commence a side to side posture. Both ants circle each other and present their gasters directed to their opponent, and on some occasions, either one or both of the ants would kick outward using their legs at each other. Eventually, they will break contact and groom once appeasement has been reached and continue to search for another ant.

=== Relationship with other organisms ===
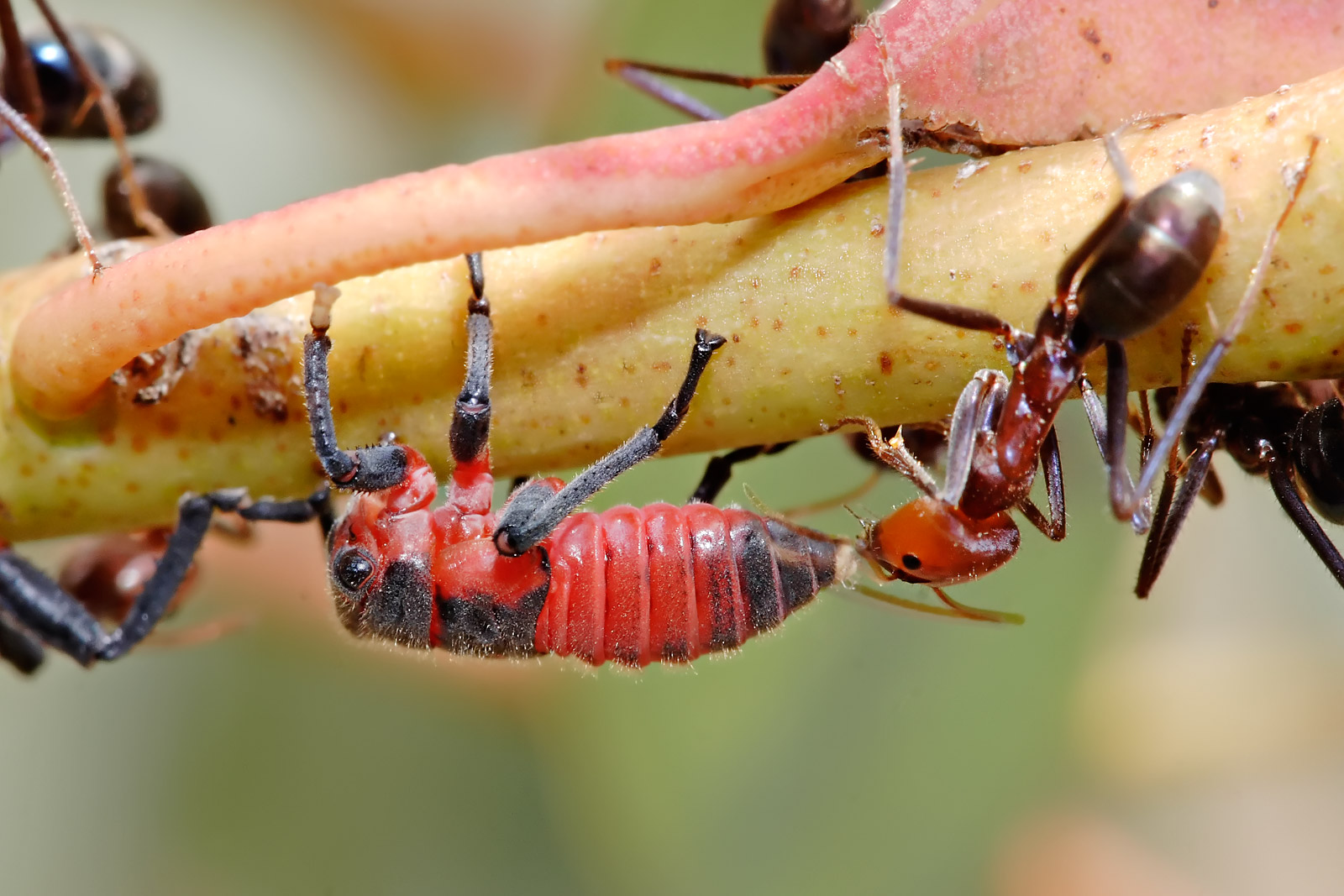
Common jassid nymph

A common competitor of meat ants are banded sugar ants. They have been observed blocking banded sugar ant nesting holes with pebbles and soil to prevent them from leaving their nest during the early hours of the day. Banded sugar antscounter this by preventing meat ants from leaving their nest by blocking their nesting holes with debris, a behaviour known as nest-plugging. If meat ant nests are encroached by trees or other shade, banded sugar ants may invade and take over the nest, since the health of the colony may deteriorate from overshadowing. Members of an affected meat ant colony later move to a nearby satellite nest that is placed in a suitable area, while invading banded sugar ants fill nest galleries up with a black resinous material. Meat ants sometimes attract cats because of the chemicals they secrete (dihydronepetalactone, isodihydronepetalactone and iridomyrmecin).

Meat ants are generally intolerant of myrmecophiles (which are insects or other organisms that share positive interspecies associations with ants) living in their colonies, but Cyclotorna larvae are known to dwell in colonies. Although Sphallomorpha larvae sometimes prey on workers as discussed earlier, some are inquilines and live in the nest commensally. Unused or abandoned areas inside colonies are sometimes occupied by other species of ants and in some cases, termites. Meat ants may deliberately destroy the colonies of the termite Amitermes laurensis if competition between the two intensify. Another termite, Coptotermes acinaciformis, can detect foraging meat ants and avoid them using vibrational cues from their footsteps, instead of chemical signals from the ants. Their ability to eavesdrop on the ants, even through thin wood, allows C. acinaciformis to forage extremely close to them without being killed.

Meat ants share symbiotic relationships with a number of insects, including caterpillars of different butterflies. The caterpillars are protected by the workers from predators, which in turn supply the ants a sugary sap. The larvae of Phyllolyrna rufa, a species psyllid, excrete a crystalline and brittle lerp that foraging workers feed on. The ants also visit some leafhoppers and aphids such as the Common jassid (Eurymela fenestrata) and the American ragwort aphid (Aphis lugentis). A. lugentis is an invasive species native to the United States and was first detected on Kangaroo Island in late 2018. Multiple native ants tended to these aphids, including I. purpureus, under Senecio odoratus leaves.

Meat ants play an important role in seed dispersal. A meat ant colony is capable of dispersing 334,000 individual bellyache bush (Jatropha gossypiifolia) seeds per hectare, which shows a strong ant-seed relationship among the two. The ants can also disperse seeds at great distances, with one study noting dispersal distances of Acacia pycnantha seeds at 69 metres (226 ft) in undisturbed areas. This distance increased to 120 metres (390 ft) in disturbed areas (such as areas affected by roadwork activities). Meat ants are not only more abundant in disturbed roadside environments, but they disperse a higher portion of seeds in these zones compared to other ants. When workers encounter other ants trying to move seeds, they will often rob them of these seeds. Due to these ants frequently moving seeds, along with long-distance dispersal events, studies suggest that they may play an important role in plant colonisation alongside newly constructed roadsites. Another study also observed meat ants dispersing Acacia longifolia seeds and Extatosoma tiaratum eggs at higher rates compared to other ants.

== Relationship with humans ==
Meat ants are able to kill poisonous cane toads, an introduced pest, as the toxins exuded by the toad, usually lethal against its predators, do not affect the meat ants. Due to this, scientists in Australia have considered using meat ants as a form of pest control to reduce the cane toad population. One way of doing this is by establishing meat ant nests in habitats where cane toad numbers are high. In rural Australia, meat ants are important to farmers, who place animal carcasses on ant nests to get rid of them. In a matter of weeks, the entire carcass is consumed and reduced to bones. The meat ant is highly aggressive, and workers will pour out of entrance holes to attack if a human or animal disturbs their nest.

=== As pests ===
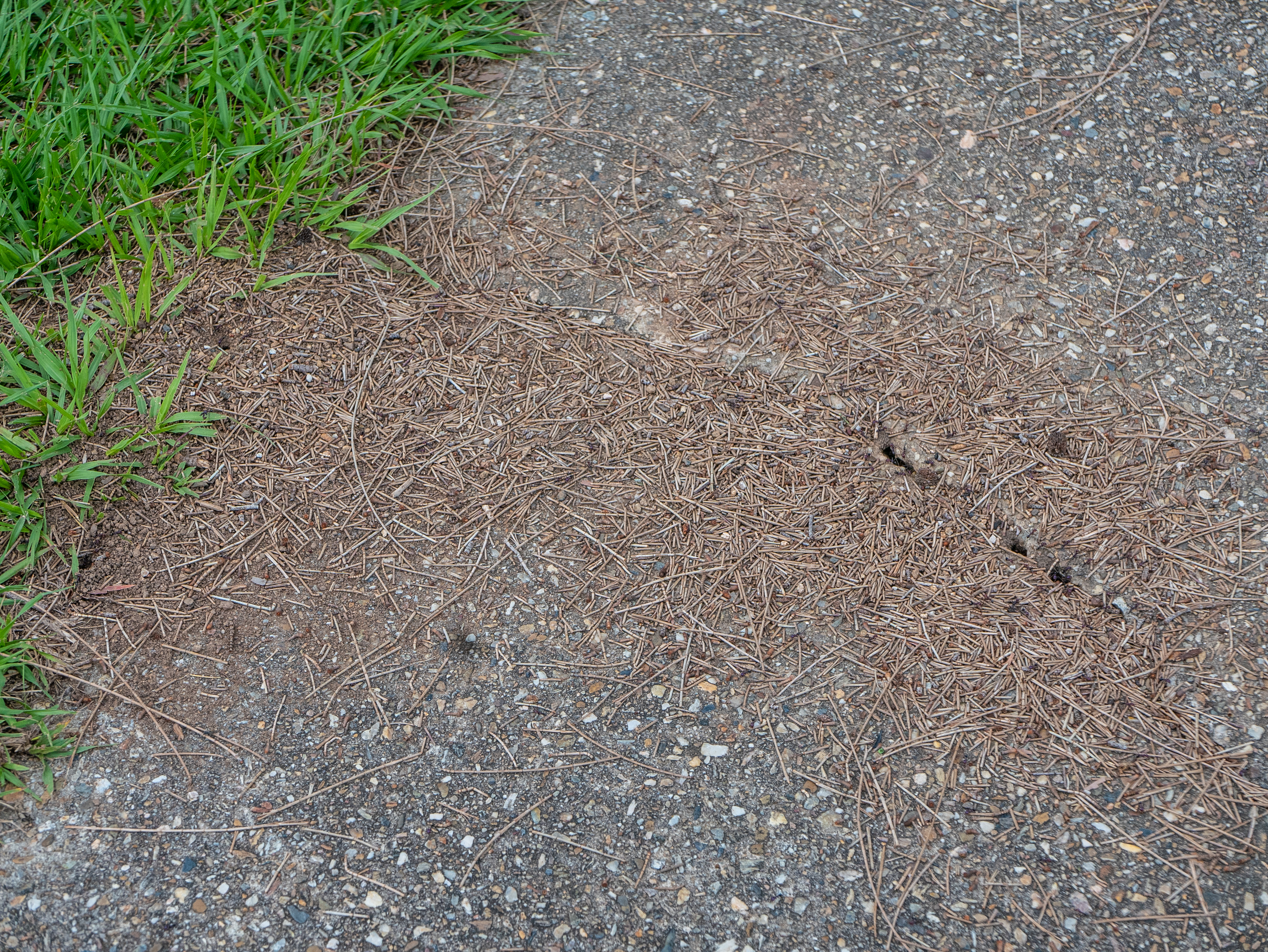
Nests built in urban areas may cause annoyance to humans

Despite their beneficial importance to humans, meat ants are sometimes considered pests, due to these ants disturbing the soil in urban areas and entering human houses occasionally to feed. The nests may cause annoyance if they are built around gravel paths, tennis courts and other cleared spaces - they do not nest in buildings or cause damage to them. Although meat ants enter houses occasionally, they have adapted well to urbanisation and populations can flourish in urban areas. During the early days of the city of Canberra, newly constructed suburbs provided new nest sites for meat ants. Unpaved streets, gravel paths and driveways are among the many new sites meat ants could nest in, making them a commonly encountered ant that may pose as a considerable pest to many. The abundance of food supplies from parks, plantations and home gardens also attracted meat ants to urban areas. They pose a serious problem for citrus growers in eastern Australia, because they affect the biological control of Hemiptera insects, specifically those who produce honeydew. The ants can also encourage outbreaks of certain pests, such as aphids and scale insects, by transporting them onto trees in orchards. Meat ants lack a stinger, but they can induce irritating bites and secrete a defensive fluid from the end of their abdomen. Meat ants have been reported causing mortality amongst poultry.

Many attempted methods of eradicating meat ants have proven unsuccessful. The first investigations were made in the 1930s to control meat ant populations in urban areas by fumigation, using carbon disulfide and calcium cyanide. Although these methods successfully eradicated some nests, they were rapidly reoccupied by those living in satellite or rival nests. However, the reoccupation of these nests by incipient colonies (young colonies beginning to develop) does not occur. This is because colony founding is often difficult and rare when most areas are nested by mature colonies. This behaviour has led to long-term maintenance and repeated treatments to ensure the nests are not resettled. In addition, not all nests can be treated, and some may remain undetected from pest controllers. In 1973, Greaves notes that the poor penetration of insecticides into all nest galleries may be the reason why nests are reoccupied, but owing to the nest structure, the insecticides have to be poured into each individual hole as no gallery connects the holes to one another. Missing a single gallery can lead to the reoccupation of the nest site. Greaves concludes that dieldrin is the most effective insecticide to control meat ants, capable of killing the ants quickly and being the most long-lasting chemical used.

The difficulty of eradicating meat ants has led to further studies. Two studies between 1996 and 2002 studied the effects of granular baits on meat ant colonies. Bait containing hydramethylnon and fipronil effectively reduced the number of workers foraging. However, this was only effective when 10 g (0.35 oz) of bait was placed on citrus trees or onto mounds. The ant bait Amdro was used in a recent study to identify an effective method of eradicating meat ants, but results showed that the bait failed to reduce ant populations significantly. There was evidence that the amount of active mounds declined, but this effect was only temporary. This is due to colonies only having 5 g (0.18 oz) of bait which was insufficient to eliminate further nests, but the effect may have been more dramatic if extra bait was used.

== See also ==
- List of ants of Australia
