= E. fenestrata =

E. fenestrata may refer to:

- Eurymela fenestrata, the common jassid, a leafhopper species in the genus Eurymela and the family Membracoidea
- Euxesta fenestrata, a picture-winged fly species

== See also ==
- Fenestrata (disambiguation)
