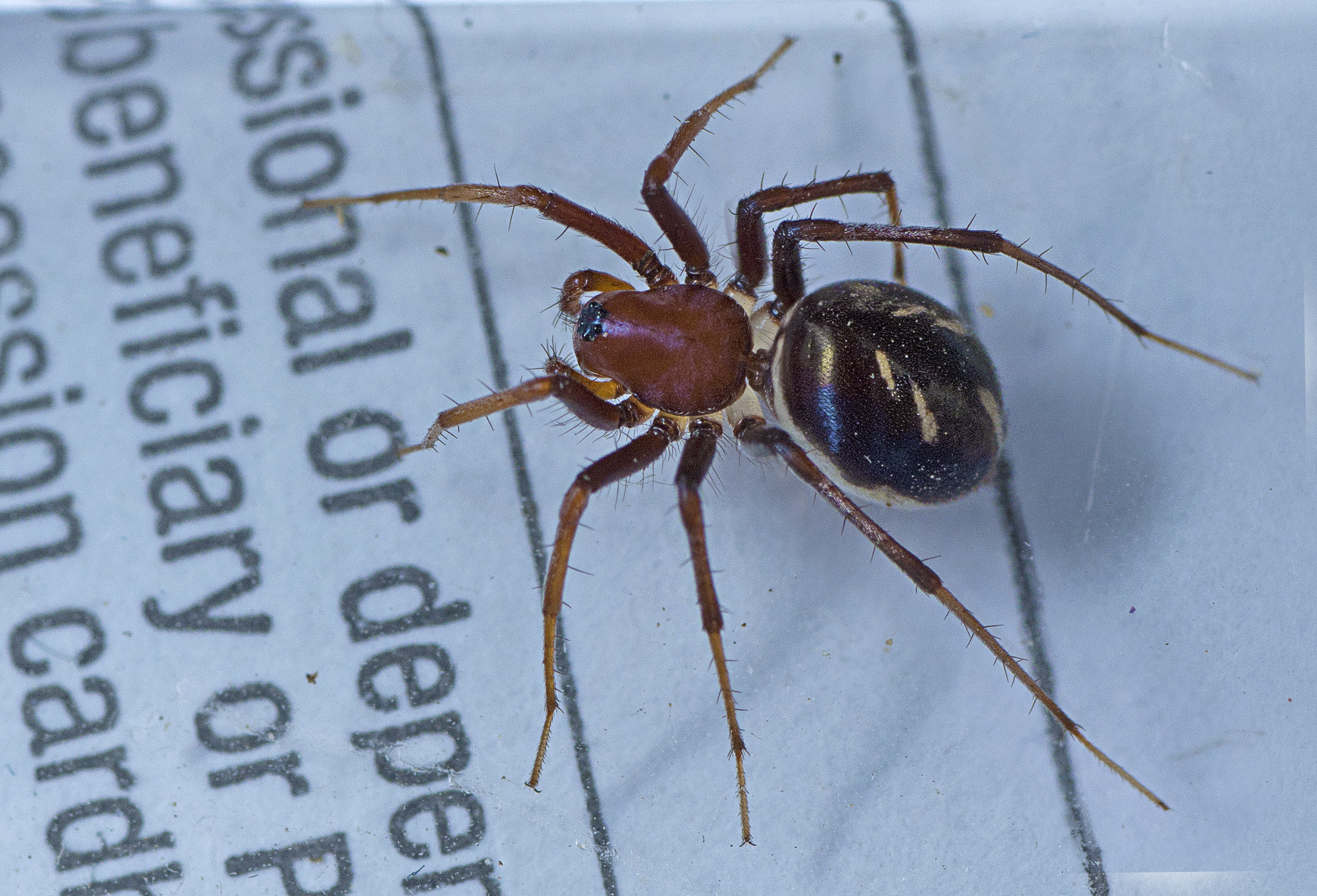
- Habronestes bradleyi

Scientific classification
- Domain: Eukaryota
- Kingdom: Animalia
- Phylum: Arthropoda
- Subphylum: Chelicerata
- Class: Arachnida
- Order: Araneae
- Infraorder: Araneomorphae
- Family: Zodariidae
- Genus: Habronestes; L. Koch, 1872

Type species
- Habronestes striatipes L. Koch, 1872

Species
- 50, see text.

= Habronestes =

Genus of spiders

Habronestes is a genus of ant spiders, known for their combination of myrmecomorphy and myrmecophagy. It contains 50 species, all found only in Australia. It was first described by Ludwig Koch in 1872, and has since been revised by Barbara Baehr in 2003.

Spiders in this genus are 2.5 to 10.5 mm long, with an orange or sepia brown body and yellow or pale brown legs. True to their name, they are often found associated with ants.

H. boq is the first spider named after a sponsor (the Bank of Queensland) in a new program by the Queensland Museum.

== Species ==
As of November 2024 it contains 50 species:

- H. archiei Baehr, 2008 — Australia (Queensland)
- H. australiensis (O. Pickard-Cambridge, 1869) — Australia
- H. bicornis Baehr, 2003 — Australia (New South Wales)
- H. bispinosus Baehr & Raven, 2009 — Australia (Tasmania)
- H. boq Baehr, 2008 — Australia (Queensland)
- H. boutinae Baehr & Raven, 2009 — Australia (Tasmania)
- H. bradleyi (O. Pickard-Cambridge, 1869) — Australia
- H. braemar Baehr, 2008 — Australia (Queensland)
- H. calamitosus Jocqué, 1995 — Australia (Queensland)
- H. clausoni Baehr, 2008 — Australia (Queensland)
- H. dickmani Baehr, 2008 — Australia (Queensland)
- H. diocesegrafton Baehr, 2008 — Australia (New South Wales)
- H. driesseni Baehr & Raven, 2009 — Australia (Tasmania)
- H. driscolli Baehr, 2003 — Australia (New South Wales)
- H. drummond Baehr, 2008 — Australia (Queensland)
- H. epping Baehr & Raven, 2009 — Australia (Tasmania)
- H. gallowayi Baehr, 2008 — Australia (Queensland)
- H. gayndah Baehr, 2008 — Australia (Queensland)
- H. giganteus Baehr, 2003 — Australia (New South Wales)
- H. grahami Baehr, 2003 — Australia (New South Wales, Australian Capital Territory)
- H. grayi Baehr, 2003 — Australia (New South Wales)
- H. grimwadei (Dunn, 1951) — Australia
- H. gumbardo Baehr, 2008 — Australia (Queensland)
- H. hamatus Baehr, 2003 — Australia (New South Wales)
- H. hebronae Baehr, 2003 — Australia (Queensland, New South Wales)
- H. helenae Baehr, 2003 — Australia (New South Wales)
- H. hickmani Baehr & Raven, 2009 — Australia (Tasmania)
- H. hooperi Baehr, 2008 — Australia (Queensland)
- H. hunti Baehr, 2003 — Australia (New South Wales)
- H. jankae Baehr, 2008 — Australia (Queensland, New South Wales)
- H. jocquei Baehr, 2003 — Australia (New South Wales)
- H. longiconductor Baehr, 2003 — Australia (New South Wales)
- H. macedonensis (Hogg, 1900) — Australia (New South Wales, Victoria, Tasmania)
- H. minor Baehr, 2003 — Australia (New South Wales)
- H. monocornis Baehr, 2003 — Australia (New South Wales)
- H. piccolo Baehr, 2003 — Australia (New South Wales)
- H. pictus (L. Koch, 1865) — Australia (New South Wales, Australian Capital Territory)
- H. powelli Baehr, 2008 — Australia (New South Wales)
- H. pseudoaustraliensis Baehr, 2003 — Australia (New South Wales)
- H. raveni Baehr, 2003 — Australia (New South Wales, Victoria)
- H. rawlinsonae Baehr, 2003 — Australia (Queensland, New South Wales)
- H. striatipes L. Koch, 1872 (type) — Australia (Queensland)
- H. tasmaniensis Baehr & Raven, 2009 — Australia (Tasmania)
- H. thaleri Baehr & Raven, 2009 — Australia (Tasmania)
- H. tillmani Baehr, 2008 — Australia (Queensland, New South Wales)
- H. toddi (Hickman, 1944) — Australia (Northern Territory)
- H. ulrichi Baehr, 2008 — Australia (New South Wales)
- H. ungari Baehr, 2003 — Australia (Queensland, New South Wales)
- H. weelahensis Baehr, 2003 — Australia (Queensland, New South Wales)
- H. wilkiei Baehr, 2003 — Australia (New South Wales)
