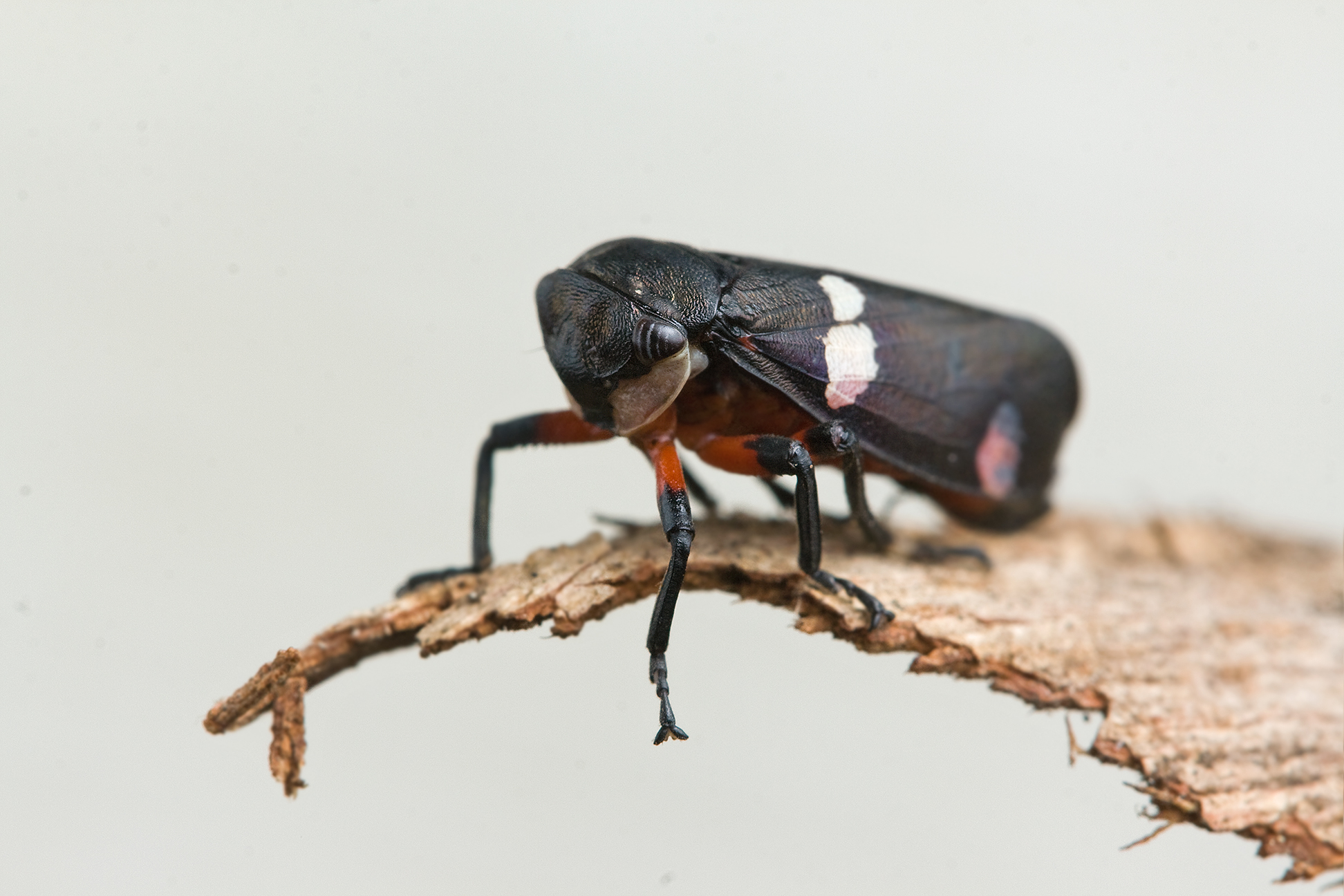

Scientific classification
- Kingdom: Animalia
- Phylum: Arthropoda
- Clade: Pancrustacea
- Class: Insecta
- Order: Hemiptera
- Suborder: Auchenorrhyncha
- Family: Cicadellidae
- Genus: Eurymela
- Species: E. distincta

Binomial name
- Eurymela distincta Signoret, 1850

Synonyms
- Eurymela vicina Signoret, 1850; Eurymela speculum Walker, 1851; Eurymela lubra Kirkaldy, 1906

= Eurymela distincta =

Species of insect

Eurymela distincta is a species of leafhopper native to the Australian continent. It has a wedge-shaped body that is 10–12 mm long (adult male) or 12–14 mm long (adult female). The head is black with cream or white maxillary plates. The pronotum and scutellum are black. The tegmen is black with a blue or purple tinge, and one to three white fasciae. The costal margin is black. Legs are scarlet close to the body and black further away. Underparts are scarlet.

E. distincta mainly feeds on the bangalay (Eucalyptus botryoides) and the apple box (Eucalyptus bridgesiana), though it has also been recorded on manna gum (E. viminalis), black gum (E. aggregate) and Camden woollybutt (E. macarthurii).

Nymphs and adults may be attended by up to 20 ants of the genus Iridomyrmex, which also attend female scale insects of the species Eriococcus coriaceus and E. confusus that infest the same trees. The ants eat the leaf-hoppers' sugary excrement, or "honeydew".

Field observations in Bungendore, New South Wales, showed that E. distincta reproduces once a year in the austral spring, with a single breeding pair occupying a tree. Mating takes place between September and October, with eggs laid from October to December. The females cut a slit lengthwise down a 1.5–3.8 cm diameter branch, lay around 12 eggs, and cover securely with a "white frothy secretion". The eggs are slender and around 2mm long. Larvae begin hatching in November and become adults in February. The vulnerable pronymph is transparent with red eyes, and transforms into the nymph before it finishes emerging from the bark (and egg). Its abdomen splits and the nymph emerges, becoming black in around 15 minutes and commencing to feed. The nymphs then gather in large numbers around the base of new growth on the branches and feed. There are five stages (instars) of nymph: the first instar resembles a black spider with red eyes and white belly, while the second gains the red abdomen of the adult and has a more elongated body.

Eurymela distincta has been recorded from Sydney and Bombala, New South Wales, Nunawading, Victoria, and Hobart, Tasmania. Adults generally hibernate over winter, though may come out on warm sunny days. Summer hailstorms or very cold winters can kill them.

The eggs are parasitised by two species of mymarid wasps, and one dryinid wasp of the genus Anteon.

== Classification ==
The species was described in 1850 by French entomologist Victor Antoine Signoret, who described Eurymela vicina at the same time. British entomologist Francis Walker described E. speculum in 1851 from several specimens that had been sent to the British Museum. In 1852, he updated the latter two species as synonyms of E. distincta. In 1906, George Willis Kirkaldy described E. lubra from a specimen he collected in Bacchus Marsh, Victoria, which he reported differed from E. distincta by virtue of its red abdomen. In 1908, William Lucas Distant wrote that Kirkaldy should have already known that the abdomen of E. distincta was red, as although Signoret failed to mention it, subsequent authors had, and hence Distant made E. lubra a synonym of E. distincta.
