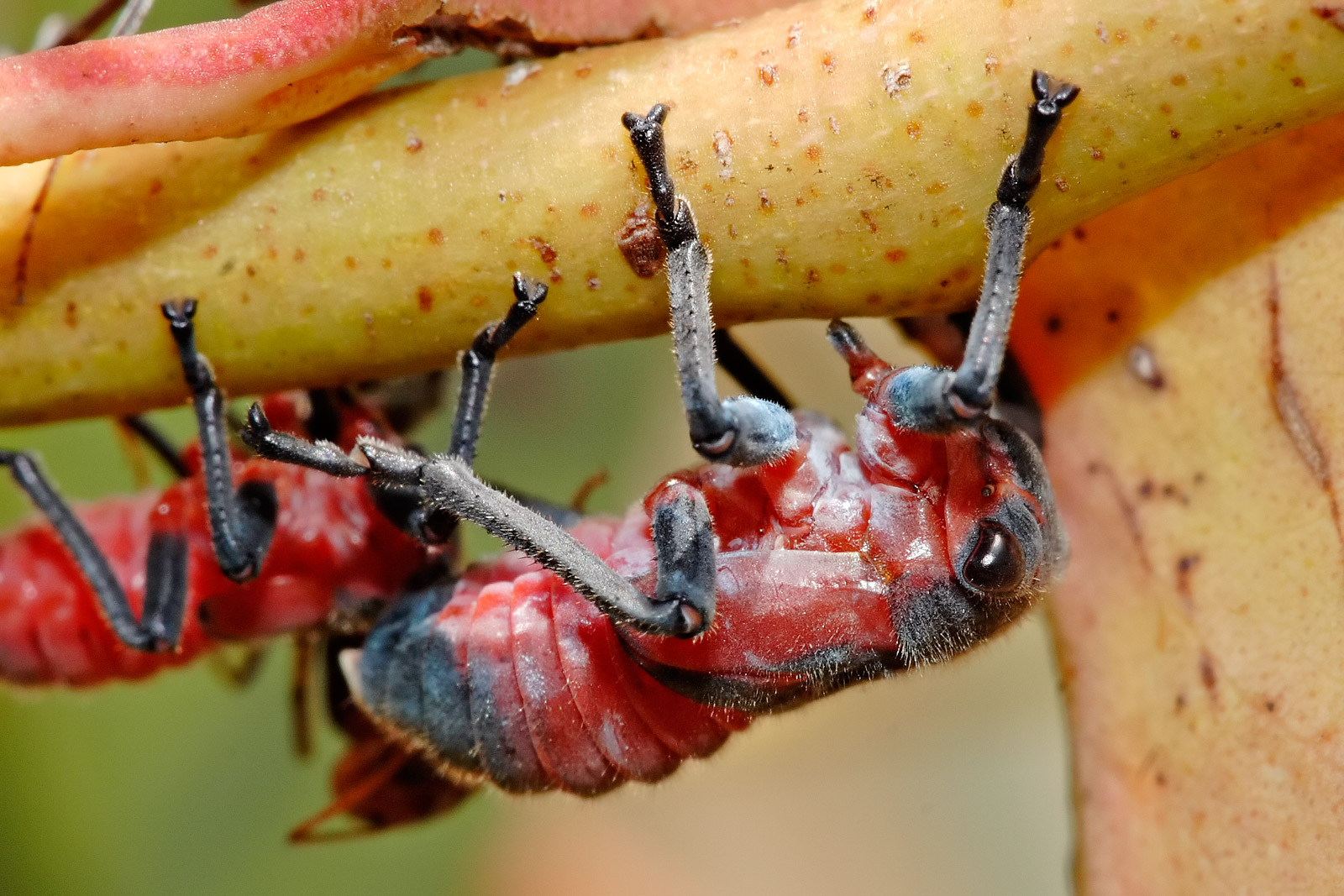
- Eurymela fenestrata

Scientific classification
- Domain: Eukaryota
- Kingdom: Animalia
- Phylum: Arthropoda
- Class: Insecta
- Order: Hemiptera
- Suborder: Auchenorrhyncha
- Family: Cicadellidae
- Subfamily: Eurymelinae
- Genus: Eurymela le Peletier & Serville, 1825

Type species
- Eurymela fenestrata

= Eurymela =

Genus of true bugs

Eurymela is a genus of leafhoppers. There are seven known species, and they are found throughout mainland Australia. The two most common species are E. fenestrata and E. distincta. E. fenestrata is the type species. Species of the genus are commonly known as "Jassids". They feed on the sap of Eucalypts.
