= Amdro =

Hydrazone insecticide

Amdro is a trade name for a hydramethylnon-based hydrazone insecticide, commonly used in the southern United States for fire ant control. Amdro was patented in 1978 by the American Cyanamid company, now Ambrands, and was conditionally approved for use by the United States Environmental Protection Agency in August, 1980. It is a delayed-toxicity food chain killer, in which soldier ants carry the bait into the mound and feed it to the queen, killing her and decimating the mound. Amdro uses a corn grit and soybean oil base, and must be used within three months after opening to be effective. Amdro has several drawbacks: (1) when it rains, or the bait is moisturized, Amdro loses its effectiveness entirely; (2) insecticide baits tend to be slow working, and take up to a month to be effective; and (3) Amdro cannot be used on food crops.
