= Hydramethylnon =

Names
- IUPAC name 2(1H-4,4-dimethyl tetrahydro pyrimidinylidene ) (3-(4-(trifluoromethyl)phenyl) -1-(2-(4-(trifluoromethyl)phenyl)ethenyl) -2-propenylidene)hydrazone

Identifiers
CAS Number	67485-29-4
3D model (JSmol)	Interactive image
ChEBI	CHEBI:38531
ChEMBL	ChEMBL464812
ChemSpider	4445168
ECHA InfoCard	100.100.669
KEGG	C10994
PubChem CID	5281875
UNII	J265GZ7MFJ
CompTox Dashboard (EPA)	DTXSID6023868
- InChI: InChI=1S/C25H24F6N4/c1-23(2)15-32-22(33-16-23)35-34-21(13-7-17-3-9-19(10-4-17)24(26,27)28)14-8-18-5-11-20(12-6-18)25(29,30)31/h3-14H,15-16H2,1-2H3,(H2,32,33,35)/b13-7+,14-8+ Key: IQVNEKKDSLOHHK-FNCQTZNRSA-N; InChI=1/C25H24F6N4/c1-23(2)15-32-22(33-16-23)35-34-21(13-7-17-3-9-19(10-4-17)24(26,27)28)14-8-18-5-11-20(12-6-18)25(29,30)31/h3-14H,15-16H2,1-2H3,(H2,32,33,35)/b13-7+,14-8+ Key: IQVNEKKDSLOHHK-FNCQTZNRBM
- SMILES: FC(F)(F)c1ccc(cc1)C=CC(=NNC2=NCC(C)(C)CN2)C=Cc3ccc(cc3)C(F)(F)F

Properties
Chemical formula	C_{25}H_{24}F_{6}N_{4}
Molar mass	494.485 g·mol^{−1}
Appearance	Yellow to orange crystalline solid
Melting point	185 to 190 °C (365 to 374 °F; 458 to 463 K)

Hazards
NFPA 704 (fire diamond)	1 1 0
- Except where otherwise noted, data are given for materials in their standard state (at 25 °C [77 °F], 100 kPa). verify (what is ?) Infobox references

Hydramethylnon (AC 217,300) is an insecticide used primarily in the form of baits for cockroaches and ants. It works by inhibiting complex III in the mitochondrial inner membrane and leads to a halting of oxidative phosphorylation (IRAC class 20A). Some brands of hydramethylnon are Amdro, Blatex, Combat, Cyaforce, Cyclon, Faslane, Grant's, Impact, Matox, Maxforce, Pyramdron, Siege, Scuttle and Wipeout. Hydramethylnon is a slow-acting poison with delayed toxicity that needs to be eaten to be effective.

== Toxicology ==
Hydramethylnon has low toxicity in mammals. The oral LD_{50} is 1100–1300 mg/kg in rats and above 28,000 mg/kg in dogs. Hydramethylnon is toxic to fish; the 96-hour LC_{50} in rainbow trout is 0.16 mg/L, 0.10 mg/L in channel catfish, and 1.70 mg/L in bluegill sunfish.

Hydramethylnon, when fed to rats for two years, led to an increase in uterine and adrenal tumors at the highest dose; therefore, the Environmental Protection Agency classifies hydramethylnon as a possible human carcinogen.

== See also ==
- Fipronil, another insecticide used for similar purposes
