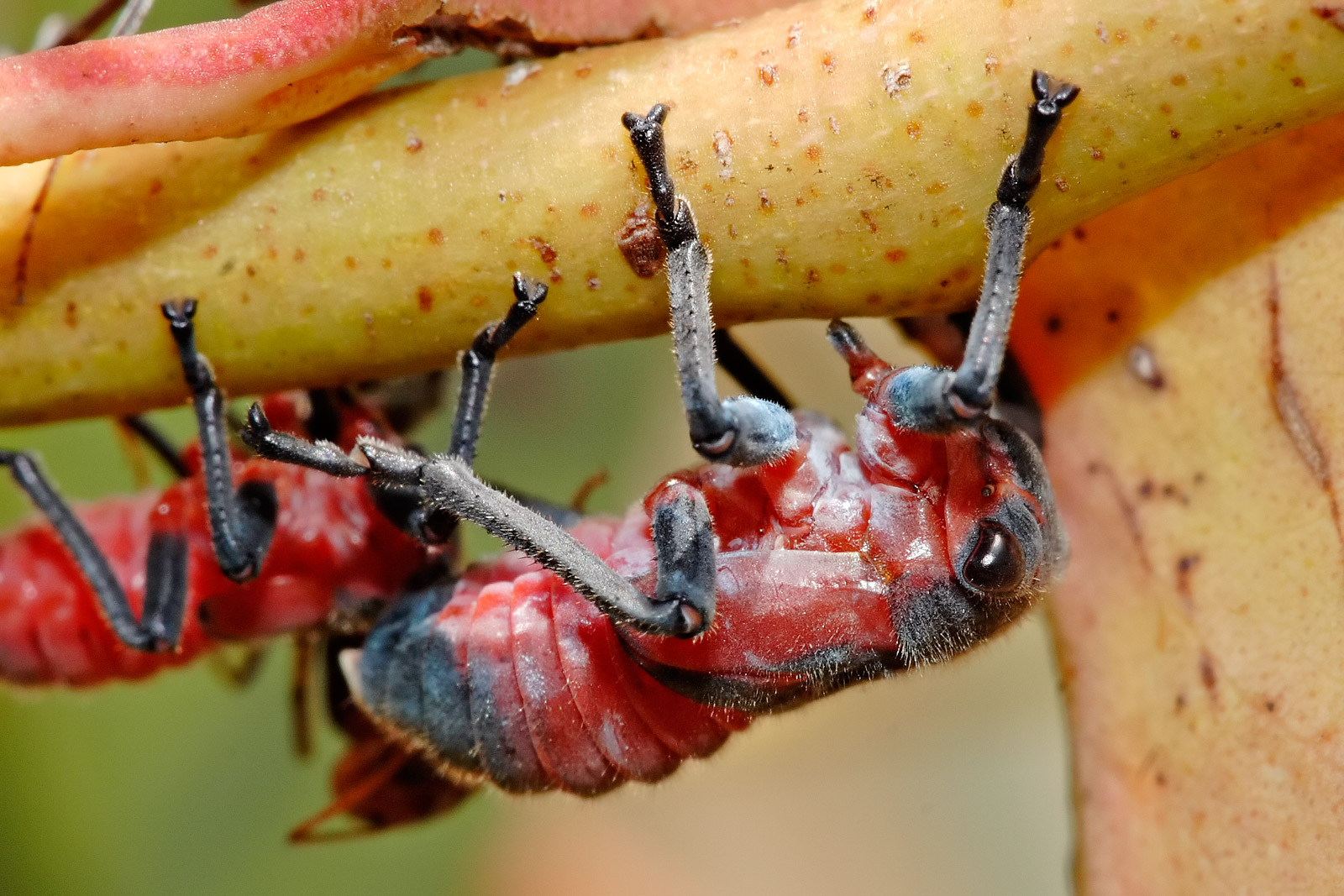
- Later stage nymph instar of Eurymela fenestrata

Scientific classification
- Kingdom: Animalia
- Phylum: Arthropoda
- Clade: Pancrustacea
- Class: Insecta
- Order: Hemiptera
- Suborder: Auchenorrhyncha
- Family: Cicadellidae
- Genus: Eurymela
- Species: E. fenestrata

Binomial name
- Eurymela fenestrata le Peletier & Serville, 1825

= Eurymela fenestrata =

Species of true bug

Eurymela fenestrata, widely known as the common jassid and sometimes as the large gum treehopper, is a species of leafhopper found throughout mainland Australia.

== Description ==
The common jassid is a large leafhopper, adults reaching a length of 15 mm (0.6 in). The body shape has been compared to a bison, and is robust and wedge-shaped, broad at the front and bluntly tapering at the back. The wide prothorax is red and the abdomen brown and deep violet, with several white patches on the wings. The limbs are black. The nymphs are reddish-brown marked with black.

== Ecology ==
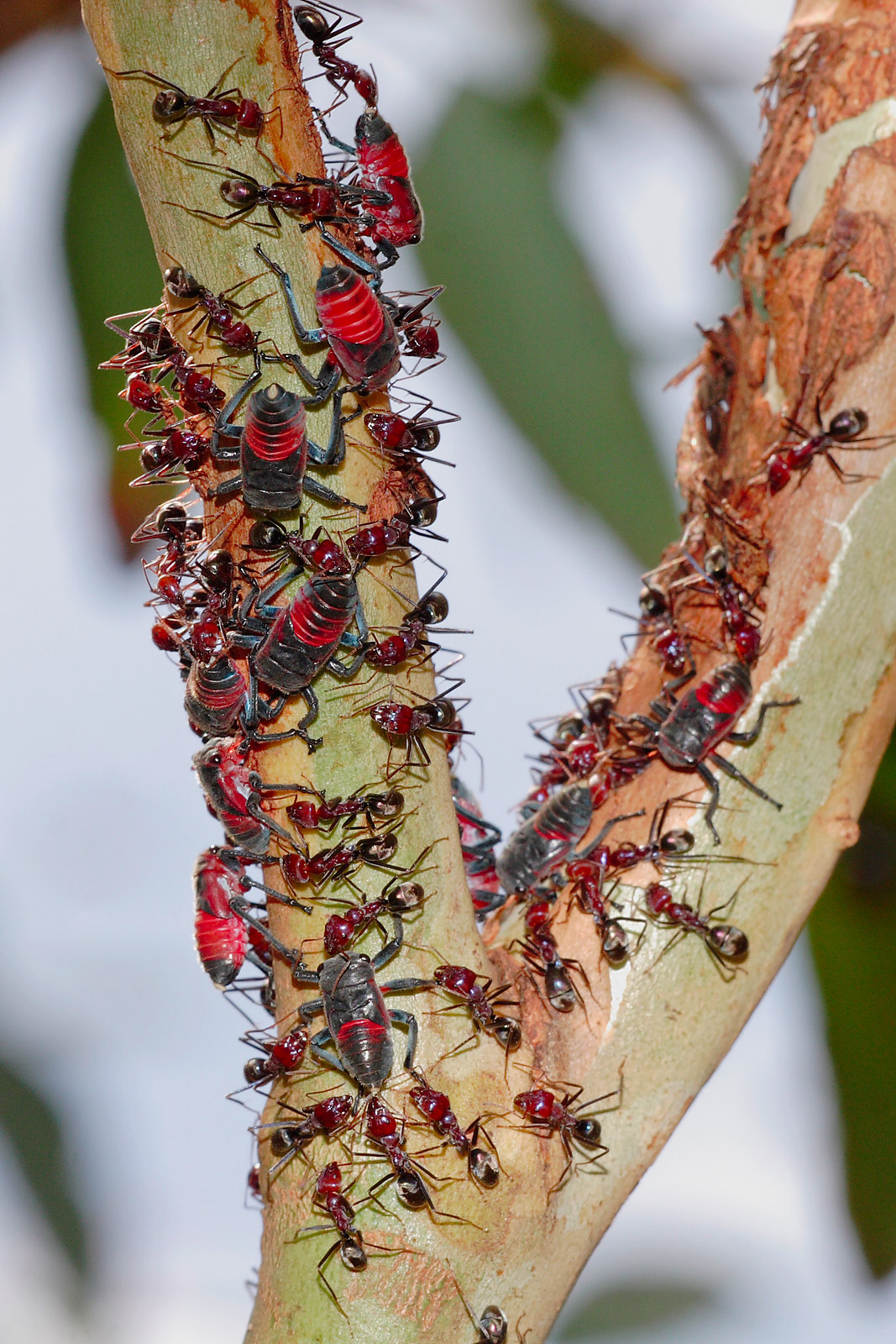
Jassid nymphs being tended by meat ants

Leafhoppers are paurometabolous insects with incomplete metamorphosis. They have an egg stage, five nymphal stages and an adult stage. In this species there is normally a single generation each year. Like other leafhoppers, the common jassid sucks sap from plants, in this case, various species of Eucalyptus. The sap is a watery fluid and large quantities need to be ingested for the insects to obtain all the nutrients they need. The excess liquid is excreted as honeydew and sooty mould often grows on this.
