= Habronestes bradleyi =

Scientific classification
- Domain: Eukaryota
- Kingdom: Animalia
- Phylum: Arthropoda
- Subphylum: Chelicerata
- Class: Arachnida
- Order: Araneae
- Infraorder: Araneomorphae
- Family: Zodariidae
- Genus: Habronestes
- Species: H. bradleyi

Binomial name
- Habronestes bradleyi (O. P-Cambridge, 1869)

Species of spider

Habronestes bradleyi is a spider species of the family Zodariidae.

Like most Zodariidae, H. bradleyi is an ant-eating spider. It detects the alarm pheromone of ants to locate them. It raises its forelegs, which contain the chemoreceptors to detect the pheromone. However, they themselves also mimic the pheromone.

== Distribution ==
H. bradleyi is a species from Australia.
