= Pseudomorpha augustata =

Scientific classification
- Domain: Eukaryota
- Kingdom: Animalia
- Phylum: Arthropoda
- Class: Insecta
- Order: Coleoptera
- Suborder: Adephaga
- Family: Carabidae
- Subfamily: Pseudomorphinae
- Genus: Pseudomorpha
- Species: P. augustata

Binomial name
- Pseudomorpha augustata G. Horn, 1883

Species of beetle

Pseudomorpha augustata is a species of ground beetle in the family Carabidae. It is found in North America.
