= Clivina opacidermis =

Scientific classification
- Domain: Eukaryota
- Kingdom: Animalia
- Phylum: Arthropoda
- Class: Insecta
- Order: Coleoptera
- Suborder: Adephaga
- Family: Carabidae
- Genus: Clivina
- Species: C. opacidermis

Binomial name
- Clivina opacidermis Baehr, 1989

Species of beetle

Clivina opacidermis is a species of ground beetle in the subfamily Scaritinae. It was described by Baehr in 1989.
