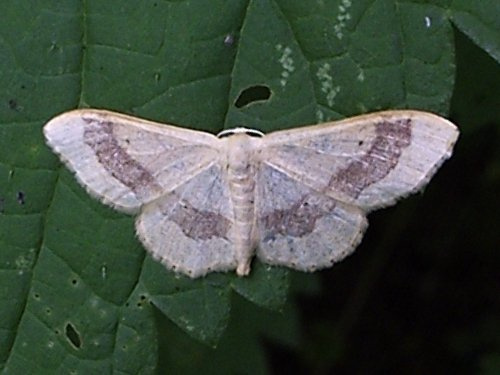
- On a nettle leaf
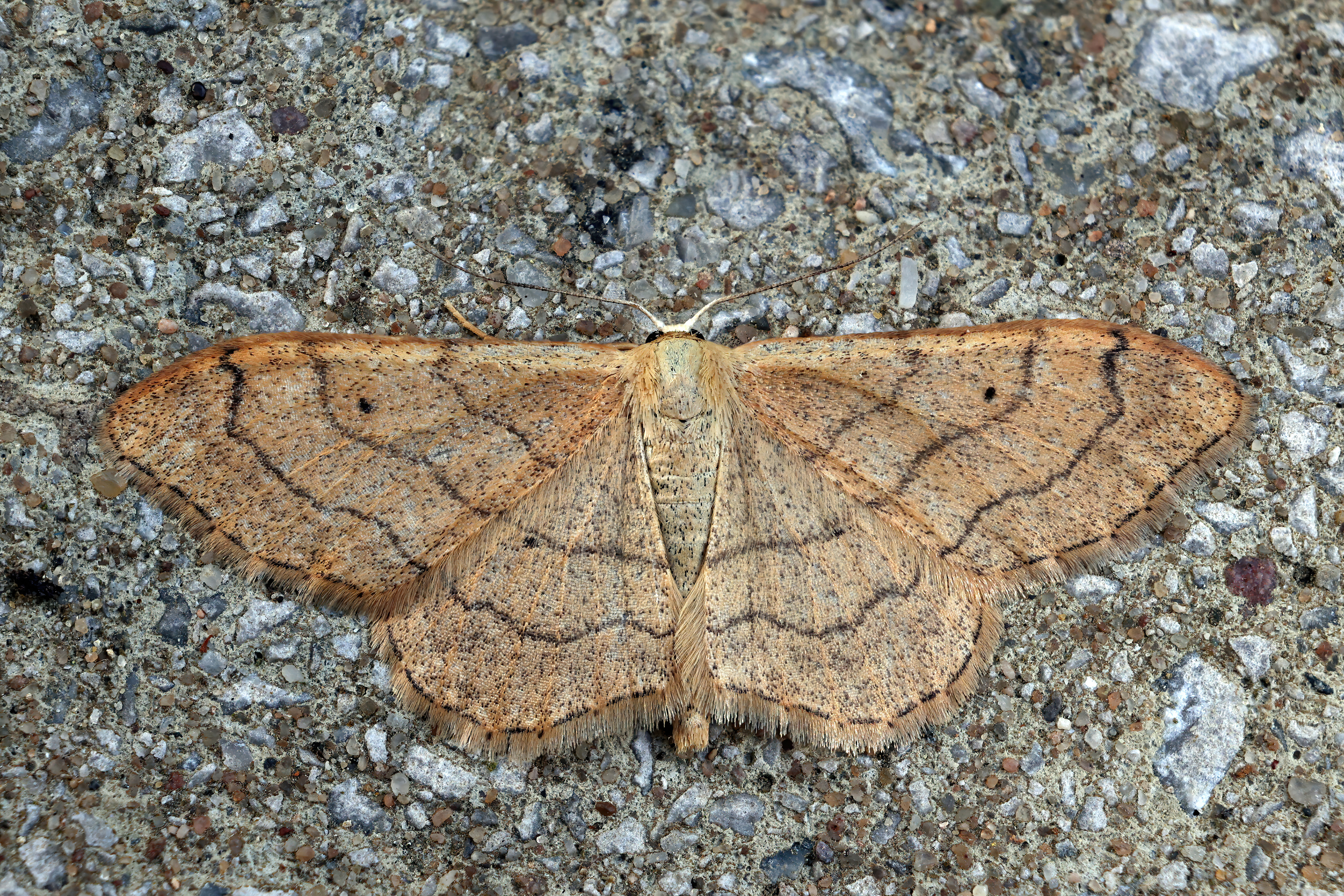
- form remutata

Scientific classification
- Kingdom: Animalia
- Phylum: Arthropoda
- Class: Insecta
- Order: Lepidoptera
- Family: Geometridae
- Genus: Idaea
- Species: I. aversata

Binomial name
- Idaea aversata (Linnaeus, 1758)

= Riband wave =

Species of moth

The riband wave (Idaea aversata) is a moth of the family Geometridae. The species was first described by Carl Linnaeus in his 1758 10th edition of Systema Naturae.

== Distribution ==
It is an abundant species in Europe, the Near East and North Africa and across the Palearctic. Records are few in the Iberian Peninsula and the Balkan Peninsula. The north border is northern Sweden and northern Finland. The northernmost parts of Russia and a few areas of Russia, northwest of the Caspian Sea are excluded. In North Africa (eastern Algeria and Tunisia), there is a smaller presence belonging to a separate subspecies (Idaea aversata indeviata Prout, 1935). Outside Europe, the distribution area extends from northern Turkey up to the Caucasus, from there via Central Asia, Siberia and north-east China to Japan. The occurrence in Japan is regarded as subspecies (Idaea aversata japonica Inoue, 1955). A small, isolated occurrence in southern Turkey is remarkable.

== Description ==
The species has a wingspan of 30–35 mm. Its distinctive outline is familiar at lighted windows. The wings are buff or cream with dark fasciae (bands). Two main forms exist, equally abundant: one has darker shading between the central fasciae, the other (designated ab. remutata) has not. The ground colour of the wings is whitish yellow to ochre. Some specimens have a red-orange colouring. The pattern elements are dark brown and clearly shown. On the forewings there are three crosslines; on the hindwings there are two crosslines. The outer cross line has a significant outward angle near the costa. The area between the middle and outer cross line is dark brown. The discal flecks are small and inconspicuous, they may also be missing. Small marginal dots lie at the outer edge and can make almost a narrow marginal line. See also Prout and Hausmann

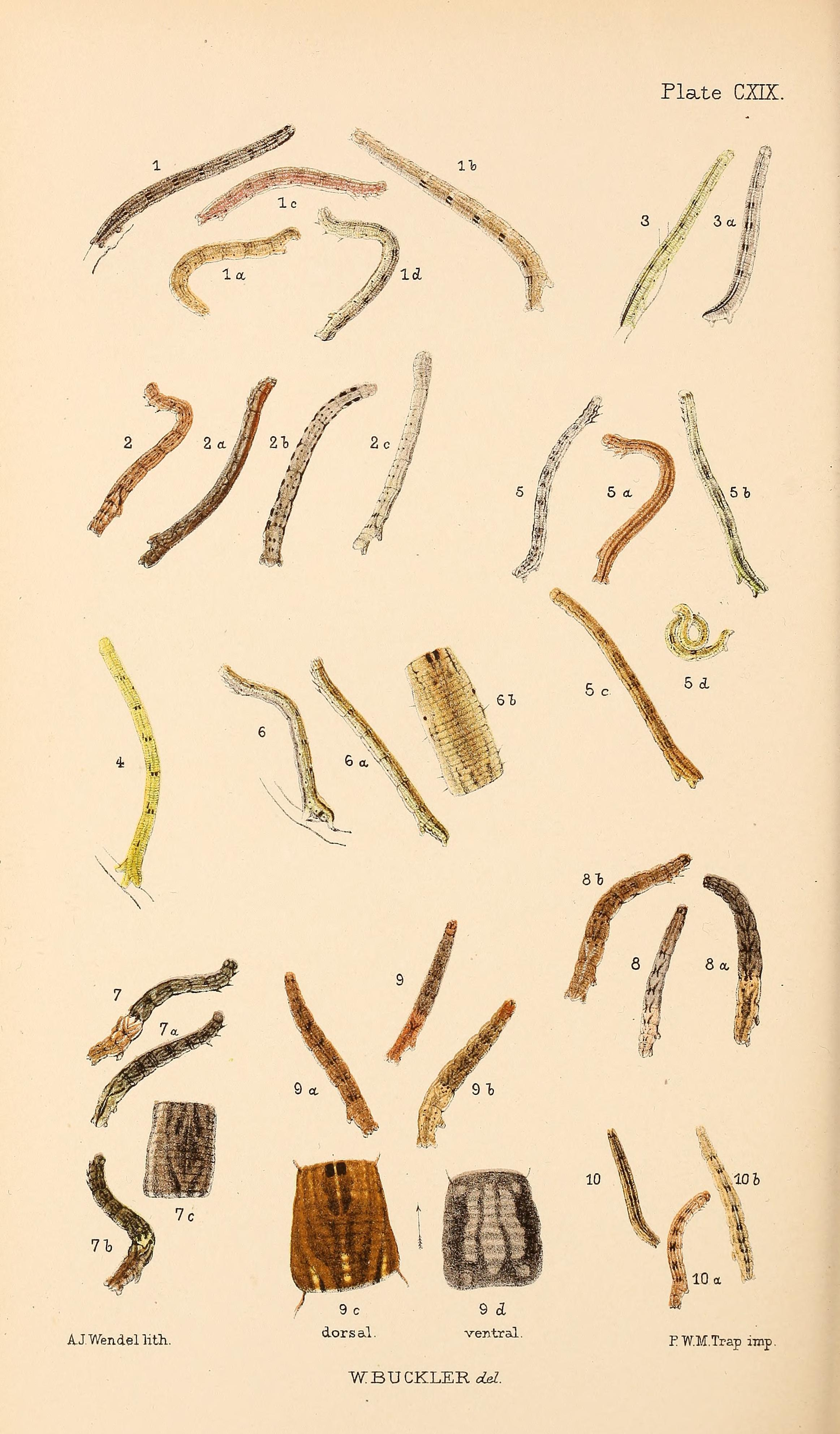
2, 2a, 2b, 2c and 7,7a,7b larvae after final moult

The larva is moderately stout, tapering anteriorly and somewhat flattened, with a projecting and puckered lateral ridge The head small and reddish brown thickly dusted with black. The body is rugose, the skin transversely folded and dull brown. The posterior four segments are paler, tinged with ochreous. The dorsal line is whitish, indistinct, on the thorax and last four abdominals with a dark bordering, on the intermediate segments accompanied by brown V-shaped markings, There are one or two white dorsal spots and the subdorsal line s indistinct. The lateral line is whitish ochreous its underside dark, with a blunt pale wedge-shaped blotch on each segment, containing two brown lines, and followed by a smaller one in which is a grey V. The pupa is smooth but not glossy, rather blunt anteriorly; pale reddish brown, darker dorsally and at the segmental incisions, wings greenish, cremaster dark brown.

== Biology ==
The adults fly at night from June to August, occasionally later, and are attracted to light.

The larva feeds on a variety of plants including bedstraw, chickweed, dandelion and knotgrass. The species overwinters as a small larva.

1. The flight season refers to the British Isles. This may vary in other parts of the range.

== Bibliography ==
- Chinery, Michael Collins Guide to the Insects of Britain and Western Europe 1986 (Reprinted 1991)
- Skinner, Bernard Colour Identification Guide to Moths of the British Isles 1984
- Sihvonen, Pasi (2006). "The Sterrhinae moth fauna of Fenglin Nature Reserve, North-East China (Insecta, Lepidoptera, Geometridae)". Spixiana. 29 (3): 247–257. München. ISSN 0341-8391.
