= Notagonum lackneri =

Scientific classification
- Domain: Eukaryota
- Kingdom: Animalia
- Phylum: Arthropoda
- Class: Insecta
- Order: Coleoptera
- Suborder: Adephaga
- Family: Carabidae
- Genus: Notagonum
- Species: N. lackneri

Binomial name
- Notagonum lackneri Baehr, 2010

Species of beetle

Notagonum lackneri is a species of ground beetle in the subfamily Platyninae. It was described by Baehr in 2010.

It is named after the collector, Tomas Lackner. The species is found in Central Papua, Indonesia.
