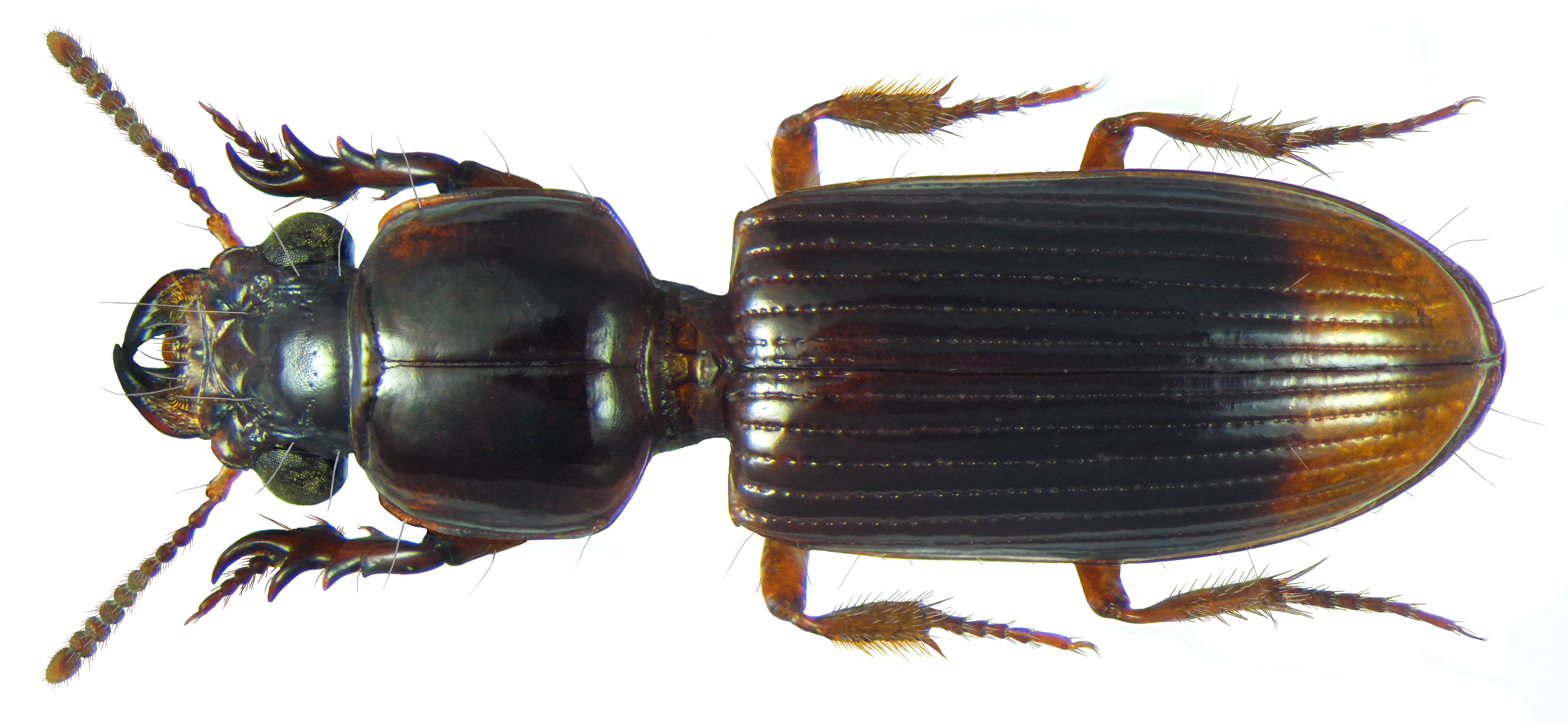
- Pseudoclivina grandis

Scientific classification
- Kingdom: Animalia
- Phylum: Arthropoda
- Class: Insecta
- Order: Coleoptera
- Suborder: Adephaga
- Family: Carabidae
- Subtribe: Sparostesina
- Genus: Pseudoclivina; Kult, 1947

= Pseudoclivina =

Genus of beetles

Pseudoclivina is a genus of beetles in the family Carabidae, containing the following species:

- Pseudoclivina assamensis (Putzeys, 1846)
- Pseudoclivina australiana Baehr, 2008
- Pseudoclivina bohemani (Putzeys, 1861)
- Pseudoclivina calida (Putzeys, 1867)
- Pseudoclivina costata (Andrewes, 1929)
- Pseudoclivina grandis (Dejean, 1826)
- Pseudoclivina mandibularis (Dejean, 1831)
- Pseudoclivina memnonia (Dejean, 1831)
- Pseudoclivina muelleriana (Kult, 1959)
- Pseudoclivina puchneri Dostal, 2012
- Pseudoclivina senegalensis (Dejean, 1831)
- Pseudoclivina testacea (Putzeys, 1846)
