= Clivina demarzi =

Scientific classification
- Domain: Eukaryota
- Kingdom: Animalia
- Phylum: Arthropoda
- Class: Insecta
- Order: Coleoptera
- Suborder: Adephaga
- Family: Carabidae
- Genus: Clivina
- Species: C. demarzi

Binomial name
- Clivina demarzi Baehr, 1988

Species of beetle

Clivina demarzi is a species of ground beetle in the subfamily Scaritinae. It was described by Baehr in 1988.
