= Notagonum subimpressum =

Scientific classification
- Domain: Eukaryota
- Kingdom: Animalia
- Phylum: Arthropoda
- Class: Insecta
- Order: Coleoptera
- Suborder: Adephaga
- Family: Carabidae
- Genus: Notagonum
- Species: N. subimpressum

Binomial name
- Notagonum subimpressum Darlington, 1952

Species of beetle

Notagonum subimpressum is a species of ground beetle in the subfamily Platyninae. It was described by Darlington in 1952.
