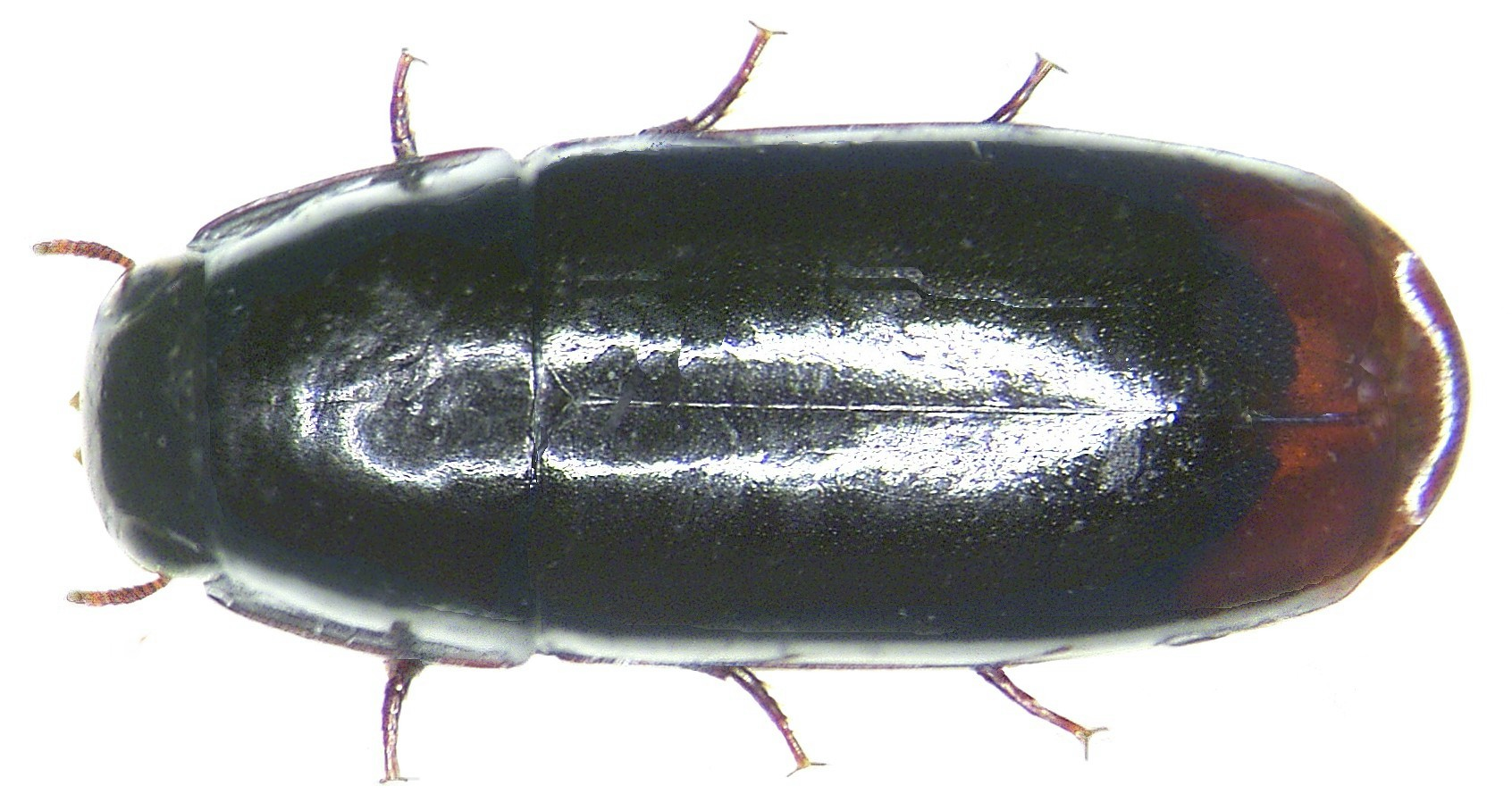
- Adelotopus haemorrhoidalis

Scientific classification
- Kingdom: Animalia
- Phylum: Arthropoda
- Clade: Pancrustacea
- Class: Insecta
- Order: Coleoptera
- Suborder: Adephaga
- Family: Carabidae
- Subfamily: Pseudomorphinae
- Genus: Adelotopus; Hope, 1836

= Adelotopus =

Genus of beetles

Adelotopus is a genus in the beetle family Carabidae. There are more than 130 described species in Adelotopus.

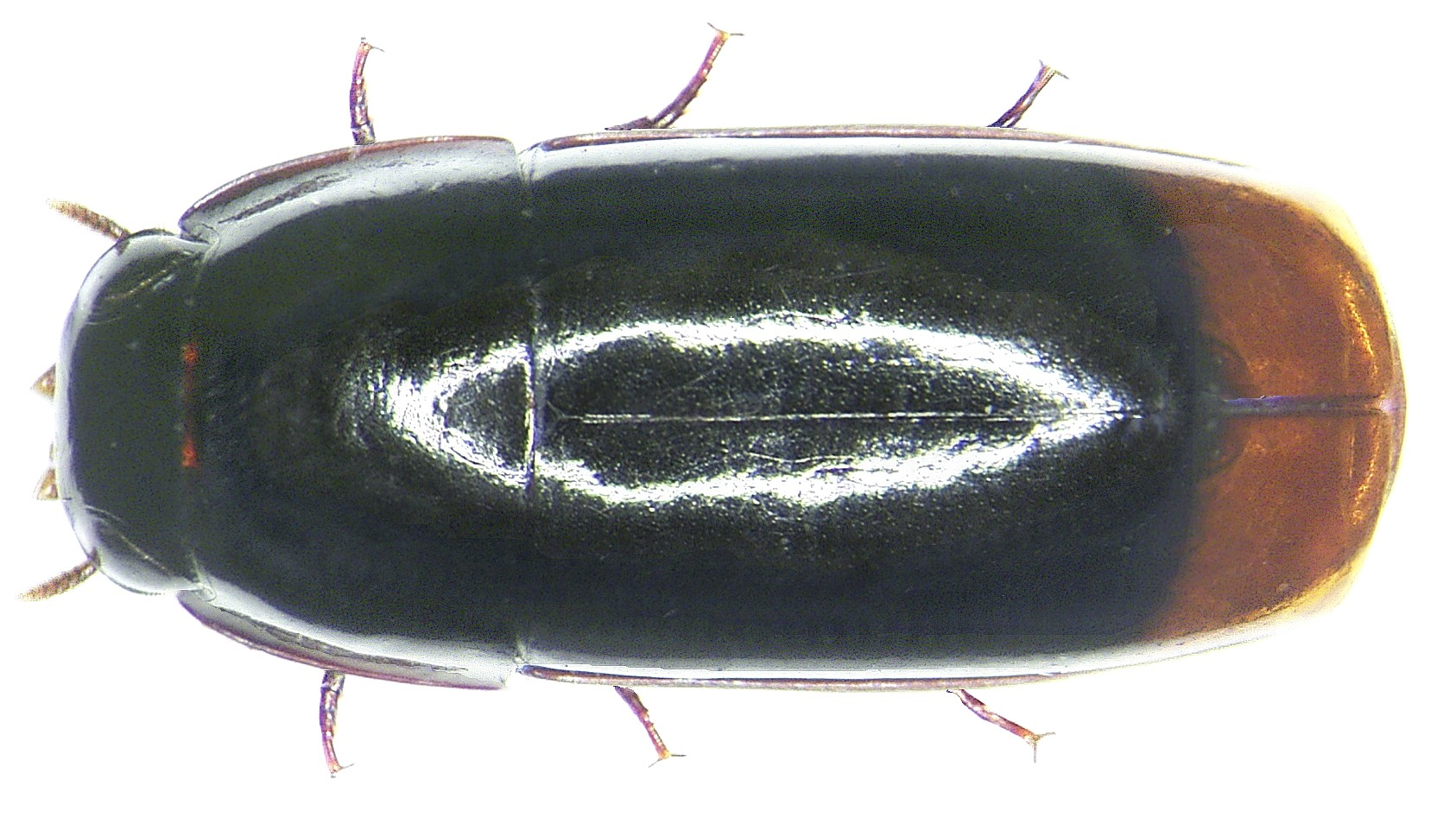
Adelotopus jacobsoni

== Species ==
These 134 species belong to the genus Adelotopus:

- Adelotopus adelaideae Baehr, 1997
- Adelotopus adustus Baehr, 1997
- Adelotopus aequus Baehr, 1997
- Adelotopus affinis Laporte, 1867
- Adelotopus analis W.J.MacLeay, 1871
- Adelotopus angustatus Baehr, 1997
- Adelotopus apicalis W.J.MacLeay, 1864
- Adelotopus aterrimus Baehr, 1997
- Adelotopus atrorufus Baehr, 1997
- Adelotopus bacillus Baehr, 1997
- Adelotopus bamagae Baehr, 1997
- Adelotopus basalis Baehr, 2008
- Adelotopus basirufus Baehr, 1997
- Adelotopus bilyi Baehr, 2002
- Adelotopus bimaculatus W.J.MacLeay, 1864
- Adelotopus brevior Baehr, 1997
- Adelotopus brevipennis W.J.MacLeay, 1888
- Adelotopus brittoni Baehr, 1997
- Adelotopus browni Baehr, 1997
- Adelotopus calvus Baehr, 1997
- Adelotopus caniae Baehr, 1997
- Adelotopus celeripes Lea, 1910
- Adelotopus ciliatus Baehr, 1997
- Adelotopus clepsydra Baehr, 1997
- Adelotopus conicollis Baehr, 1997
- Adelotopus convexicollis Baehr, 1997
- Adelotopus convexus Baehr, 1997
- Adelotopus coriaceus Baehr, 1997
- Adelotopus crassus Baehr, 1997
- Adelotopus cribricollis Baehr, 1997
- Adelotopus crucis Baehr, 1997
- Adelotopus cuneatus Baehr, 1997
- Adelotopus debitor Darlington, 1968
- Adelotopus distinguendus Baehr, 1997
- Adelotopus doyeni Baehr, 1997
- Adelotopus dubius Baehr, 1997
- Adelotopus dytiscides Newman, 1842
- Adelotopus edithae Baehr, 1997
- Adelotopus elongatulus W.J.MacLeay, 1888
- Adelotopus exactor Darlington, 1968
- Adelotopus fasciatus Laporte, 1867
- Adelotopus flavescens Baehr, 1997
- Adelotopus flavus Baehr, 1997
- Adelotopus foliaceus Baehr, 1997
- Adelotopus frater Baehr, 2009
- Adelotopus geminus Baehr, 1997
- Adelotopus gibbosus Baehr, 1997
- Adelotopus gippslandicus Baehr, 1997
- Adelotopus grossepunctatus Baehr, 1997
- Adelotopus gyrinoides Hope, 1836
- Adelotopus haemorrhoidalis Erichson, 1842
- Adelotopus houstoni Baehr, 1997
- Adelotopus howdenorum Baehr, 1997
- Adelotopus jacobsoni Ritsema, 1909
- Adelotopus katherinei Baehr, 1997
- Adelotopus kurandae Baehr, 1997
- Adelotopus laevigatus Baehr, 2002
- Adelotopus laevis W.J.MacLeay, 1888
- Adelotopus languidus Baehr, 1997
- Adelotopus laticaudatus Baehr, 1997
- Adelotopus laticollis Baehr, 1997
- Adelotopus latior Baehr, 1997
- Adelotopus latipalpis Baehr, 1997
- Adelotopus lawrencei Baehr, 1997
- Adelotopus leviusculus Baehr, 2016
- Adelotopus linearis W.J.MacLeay, 1888
- Adelotopus longiformis Baehr, 1997
- Adelotopus longus Baehr, 1997
- Adelotopus lucidus Baehr, 2002
- Adelotopus lunatus Baehr, 1997
- Adelotopus luteus Baehr, 1997
- Adelotopus macilentus Baehr, 1997
- Adelotopus maculipennis W.J.MacLeay, 1871
- Adelotopus mainae Baehr, 1997
- Adelotopus marginicollis Baehr, 1997
- Adelotopus minor Baehr, 1997
- Adelotopus minutus Baehr, 2008
- Adelotopus moffatti Baehr, 2016
- Adelotopus moluccensis Baehr, 2009
- Adelotopus montisatri Baehr, 1997
- Adelotopus montorum Baehr, 1997
- Adelotopus multipunctatus Baehr, 1997
- Adelotopus murrayanus Baehr, 1997
- Adelotopus mutchilbae Baehr, 2016
- Adelotopus nemosomoides Westwood, 1853
- Adelotopus nigerrimus Baehr, 2016
- Adelotopus nigricauda Baehr, 1997
- Adelotopus nitens Baehr, 1997
- Adelotopus nitidior Baehr, 1997
- Adelotopus obsoletus Baehr, 1997
- Adelotopus ooldeae Baehr, 1997
- Adelotopus ovatus Baehr, 1997
- Adelotopus palumae Baehr, 1997
- Adelotopus paroensis Laporte, 1867
- Adelotopus parrotti Baehr, 2007
- Adelotopus parumpunctatus Baehr, 1997
- Adelotopus penelopeae Baehr, 1997
- Adelotopus piceus Baehr, 1997
- Adelotopus pilbarae Baehr, 2008
- Adelotopus politus Laporte, 1867
- Adelotopus pulleni Baehr, 2005
- Adelotopus punctatissimus Baehr, 1997
- Adelotopus punctatus Laporte, 1867
- Adelotopus puncticollis Notman, 1925
- Adelotopus punctulifer Baehr, 1997
- Adelotopus queenslandicus Baehr, 1997
- Adelotopus rubiginosus Newman, 1856
- Adelotopus rufescens Baehr, 1997
- Adelotopus rufocaudatus Baehr, 1997
- Adelotopus rufoguttatus (Blackburn, 1893)
- Adelotopus rufomarginatus Baehr, 1997
- Adelotopus rufozonatus Baehr, 1997
- Adelotopus rugaticollis Baehr, 2002
- Adelotopus sedlaceki Baehr, 1997
- Adelotopus semilunatus Baehr, 1997
- Adelotopus seminitidus Baehr, 1997
- Adelotopus sericeus Baehr, 1997
- Adelotopus seriepunctatus Notman, 1925
- Adelotopus similis Baehr, 1997
- Adelotopus sinuaticollis Baehr, 1997
- Adelotopus sparsepunctatus Baehr, 1997
- Adelotopus substriatus Baehr, 1997
- Adelotopus tasmani Blackburn, 1901
- Adelotopus ulrichi Baehr, 1997
- Adelotopus unicolor Baehr, 1997
- Adelotopus variolosus Lea, 1910
- Adelotopus vicinus Laporte, 1867
- Adelotopus victoriensis Baehr, 1997
- Adelotopus villosus Baehr, 1997
- Adelotopus virgatus Baehr, 1997
- Adelotopus wilochrae Baehr, 2002
- Adelotopus yorkensis Baehr, 1997
- Adelotopus zborowskii Baehr, 1997
- Adelotopus zonatus Laporte, 1867
