= Notagonum chathamense =

Conservation status
- Naturally Uncommon (NZ TCS)

Scientific classification
- Kingdom: Animalia
- Phylum: Arthropoda
- Class: Insecta
- Order: Coleoptera
- Suborder: Adephaga
- Family: Carabidae
- Genus: Notagonum
- Species: N. chathamense

Binomial name
- Notagonum chathamense (Broun, 1909)

Species of beetle

Notagonum chathamense is a species of ground beetle in the subfamily Platyninae. It was described by Broun in 1909. Under the New Zealand Threat Classification System, this species is listed as "Naturally Uncommon" with the qualifiers of "Island Endemic" and "Range Restricted".
