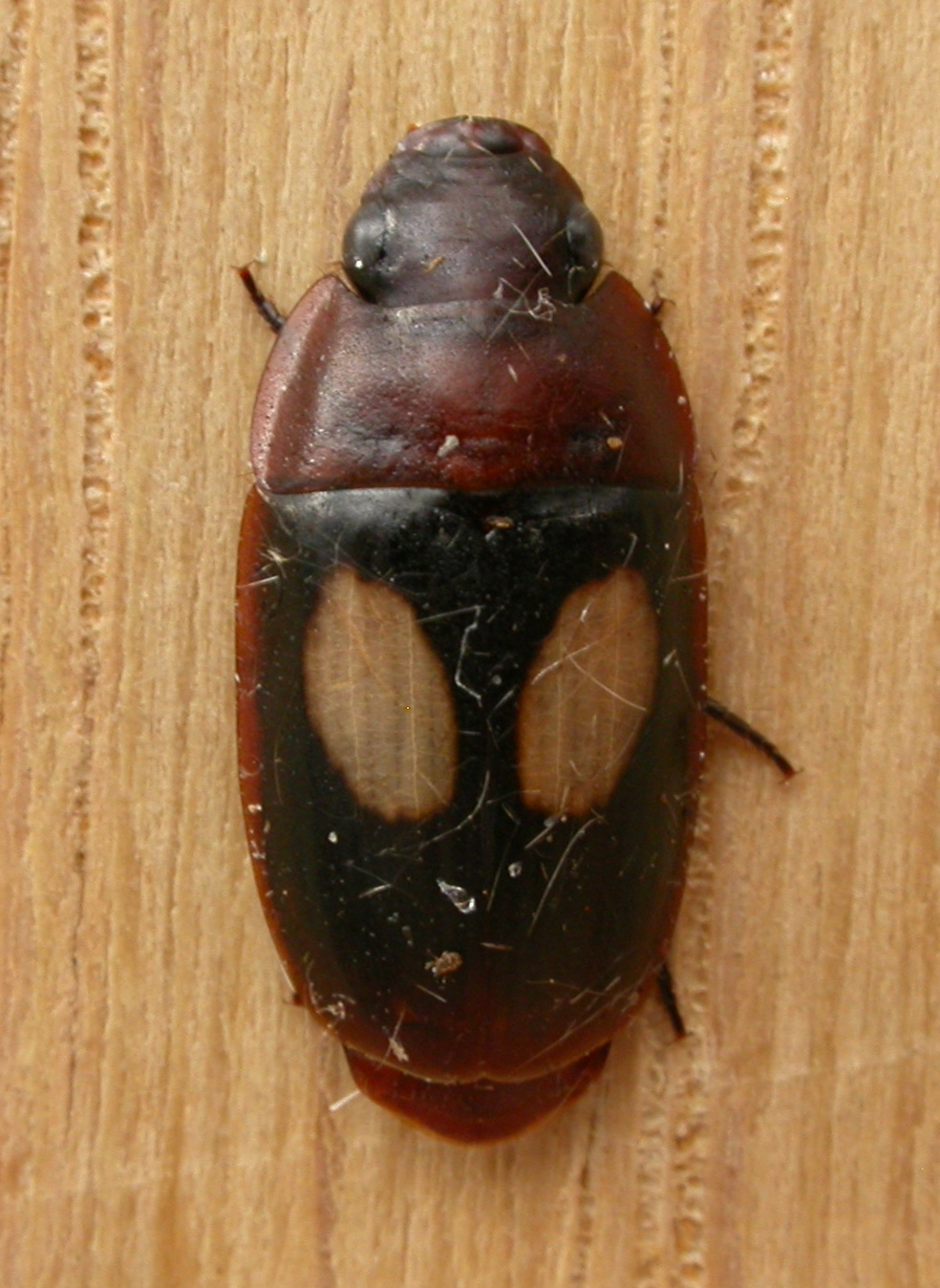
- Sphallomorpha ruficollis

Scientific classification
- Kingdom: Animalia
- Phylum: Arthropoda
- Class: Insecta
- Order: Coleoptera
- Suborder: Adephaga
- Family: Carabidae
- Subfamily: Pseudomorphinae
- Genus: Sphallomorpha; Westwood, 1840

= Sphallomorpha =

Genus of beetles

Sphallomorpha is a genus in the beetle family Carabidae. There are at least 160 described species in Sphallomorpha, found mainly in Australia, but also in Indonesia and New Guinea.

== Species ==
These 160 species belong to the genus Sphallomorpha:

- Sphallomorpha aberrans Baehr, 1992 (Australia)
- Sphallomorpha acutangula Baehr, 1992 (Australia)
- Sphallomorpha aenigmatica Baehr, 2009 (Australia)
- Sphallomorpha albopicta (Newman, 1850) (Australia)
- Sphallomorpha amabilis (Laporte, 1867) (Australia)
- Sphallomorpha atrata Baehr, 1993 (Australia)
- Sphallomorpha barbarae Baehr, 1992 (Australia)
- Sphallomorpha barbata Baehr, 1992 (Australia)
- Sphallomorpha biclavata Baehr, 1992 (Australia)
- Sphallomorpha bicolor (Laporte, 1867) (Australia)
- Sphallomorpha biguttata Baehr, 1992 (Australia)
- Sphallomorpha bilyi Baehr, 2009 (Australia)
- Sphallomorpha biplagiata (Laporte, 1867) (Australia)
- Sphallomorpha bivittata (Gestro, 1884) (Australia)
- Sphallomorpha boops (Blackburn, 1888) (Australia)
- Sphallomorpha brandti Baehr, 1992
- Sphallomorpha brevistylia Baehr, 1992 (Australia)
- Sphallomorpha carinata Baehr, 1992 (Australia)
- Sphallomorpha carnavona Baehr, 1993 (Australia)
- Sphallomorpha castelnaui (Reiche, 1868) (Australia)
- Sphallomorpha centralis (W.J.MacLeay, 1888) (Australia)
- Sphallomorpha centrolineata Baehr, 1992 (Australia)
- Sphallomorpha centroplagiata Baehr, 1992 (Australia)
- Sphallomorpha cheesmannae Baehr, 1992 (Indonesia and New Guinea)
- Sphallomorpha clypeosetosa Baehr, 2008 (Australia)
- Sphallomorpha cognata Baehr, 2016 (Australia)
- Sphallomorpha communis Baehr, 1992 (Australia)
- Sphallomorpha coriacea Baehr, 1992 (Australia)
- Sphallomorpha corrugata Baehr, 1992 (Australia)
- Sphallomorpha costalis Baehr, 1992 (Australia)
- Sphallomorpha curta Baehr, 2015 (Australia)
- Sphallomorpha dalesi Baehr, 1992 (Australia)
- Sphallomorpha darwini Baehr, 1992 (Australia)
- Sphallomorpha decipiens Westwood, 1840 (Australia)
- Sphallomorpha demarzi Baehr, 1993 (Australia)
- Sphallomorpha denisonensis (Laporte, 1867) (Australia)
- Sphallomorpha difficilis (Blackburn, 1901) (Australia)
- Sphallomorpha discoidalis (Laporte, 1867) (Australia)
- Sphallomorpha distinguenda Baehr, 1992 (Australia)
- Sphallomorpha dixoni Baehr, 1992 (Australia)
- Sphallomorpha dubia (Laporte, 1867) (Australia)
- Sphallomorpha dupla Darlington, 1968
- Sphallomorpha elseyi Baehr, 2009 (Australia)
- Sphallomorpha eungellae Baehr, 1993 (Australia)
- Sphallomorpha fallax (Westwood, 1840) (Australia)
- Sphallomorpha flavicollis (W.J.MacLeay, 1888)
- Sphallomorpha flavomarginata Baehr, 1992 (Australia)
- Sphallomorpha flavopicea Baehr, 1992 (Australia)
- Sphallomorpha flavorufa Baehr, 2008 (Australia)
- Sphallomorpha froggatti (W.J.MacLeay, 1888) (Australia)
- Sphallomorpha glabrata Baehr, 1992 (Australia)
- Sphallomorpha grandis (Laporte, 1867) (Australia)
- Sphallomorpha guttifera (Laporte, 1867) (Australia)
- Sphallomorpha guttigera (Newman, 1842) (Australia)
- Sphallomorpha hermannsburgi Baehr, 1992 (Australia)
- Sphallomorpha hydroporoides (Westwood, 1853) (Australia)
- Sphallomorpha impilosa Baehr, 1992 (Australia)
- Sphallomorpha incerta Baehr, 1992 (Australia)
- Sphallomorpha inornata Baehr, 1992 (Australia)
- Sphallomorpha interioris Baehr, 1992 (Australia)
- Sphallomorpha kurandae Baehr, 1995 (Australia)
- Sphallomorpha labralis Baehr, 1992 (Australia)
- Sphallomorpha laevigata (Laporte, 1867) (Australia)
- Sphallomorpha laevior Baehr, 2009 (Australia)
- Sphallomorpha laevis (Laporte, 1867) (Australia)
- Sphallomorpha lata Baehr, 1992 (Australia)
- Sphallomorpha latiflava Baehr, 1992 (Australia)
- Sphallomorpha latior Baehr, 1992 (Australia)
- Sphallomorpha latiplagiata Baehr, 1994 (New Guinea)
- Sphallomorpha litterata Baehr, 1992 (Indonesia and New Guinea)
- Sphallomorpha longiplagiata Baehr, 1992 (Australia)
- Sphallomorpha lustrans Baehr, 1992 (New Guinea and Australia)
- Sphallomorpha lyra Baehr, 1992 (Australia)
- Sphallomorpha macleayi (Masters, 1895) (Australia)
- Sphallomorpha maculata (Newman, 1840) (Australia)
- Sphallomorpha maculigera (W.J.MacLeay, 1864) (Australia)
- Sphallomorpha marginata (Laporte, 1867) (Australia)
- Sphallomorpha marginoides Baehr, 1992 (Australia)
- Sphallomorpha mastersii (W.J.MacLeay, 1864) (Australia)
- Sphallomorpha metallica Baehr, 1992 (Australia)
- Sphallomorpha meyeri Baehr, 1992 (Australia)
- Sphallomorpha minima Baehr, 1992 (Australia)
- Sphallomorpha minor Baehr, 1992 (Australia)
- Sphallomorpha mjobergi Baehr, 1992 (Australia)
- Sphallomorpha monteithi Baehr, 1992 (Australia)
- Sphallomorpha moorei Baehr, 1992 (Australia)
- Sphallomorpha multipunctata Baehr, 1992 (Australia)
- Sphallomorpha multiseta Baehr, 1992 (Australia)
- Sphallomorpha murrayana Baehr, 1992 (Australia)
- Sphallomorpha nigrina Baehr, 1992 (Australia)
- Sphallomorpha nitiduloides Guérin-Méneville, 1844 (Australia)
- Sphallomorpha novaeguineae Baehr, 1992
- Sphallomorpha obsoleta (W.J.MacLeay, 1888) (Australia)
- Sphallomorpha occidentalis (Laporte, 1867) (Australia)
- Sphallomorpha ochracea Baehr, 1992 (Australia)
- Sphallomorpha oculata Baehr, 2004 (Indonesia and New Guinea)
- Sphallomorpha ovalis (Laporte, 1867) (Australia)
- Sphallomorpha parallela Baehr, 1992 (Australia)
- Sphallomorpha parinterioris Baehr, 2008 (Australia)
- Sphallomorpha parva Baehr, 1992 (Australia)
- Sphallomorpha pauciseta Baehr, 2006 (Australia)
- Sphallomorpha permutata Baehr, 2008 (Australia)
- Sphallomorpha pernigra Baehr, 1992 (Australia)
- Sphallomorpha picta (Laporte, 1867) (Australia)
- Sphallomorpha pilosa Baehr, 1992 (Australia)
- Sphallomorpha plagiata Baehr, 2005 (Australia)
- Sphallomorpha polita (W.J.MacLeay, 1871) (Australia)
- Sphallomorpha politoides Baehr, 1992 (Australia)
- Sphallomorpha polysetosa Baehr, 1992 (Australia)
- Sphallomorpha propinqua Baehr, 2002 (Australia)
- Sphallomorpha proxima Baehr, 1992 (Australia)
- Sphallomorpha pumila Baehr, 1992 (Australia)
- Sphallomorpha punctata Baehr, 1992 (Australia)
- Sphallomorpha quadrata Baehr, 1992 (Australia)
- Sphallomorpha quadrilineata Baehr, 1992 (Australia)
- Sphallomorpha quadrimaculata (W.J.MacLeay, 1864) (Australia)
- Sphallomorpha quadriplagiata Baehr, 1992 (Australia)
- Sphallomorpha queenslandica Baehr, 1992 (Australia)
- Sphallomorpha rhomboidalis Baehr, 1992 (Australia)
- Sphallomorpha rockhamptonensis (Laporte, 1867) (Australia)
- Sphallomorpha ruficollis Baehr, 1992 (Australia)
- Sphallomorpha sculpturata Baehr, 1992 (Australia)
- Sphallomorpha sedlaceki Baehr, 1992 (Australia)
- Sphallomorpha semistriata (Laporte, 1867) (Australia)
- Sphallomorpha setifera Baehr, 1994 (Indonesia and New Guinea)
- Sphallomorpha signata Baehr, 1992 (Australia)
- Sphallomorpha similata Baehr, 1992 (Australia)
- Sphallomorpha speciosa (Pascoe, 1866) (Australia)
- Sphallomorpha spurgeoni Baehr, 1992 (Australia)
- Sphallomorpha sternoincisa Baehr, 1992 (Australia)
- Sphallomorpha storeyi Baehr, 1992 (Australia)
- Sphallomorpha striata (Laporte, 1867) (Australia)
- Sphallomorpha striatopunctata Baehr, 1992 (Australia)
- Sphallomorpha sulcata Baehr, 1992 (Australia)
- Sphallomorpha suturalis Germar, 1848 (Australia)
- Sphallomorpha suturata Baehr, 1994 (Australia)
- Sphallomorpha szitoi Baehr, 2008 (Australia)
- Sphallomorpha tamborinae Baehr, 1992 (Australia)
- Sphallomorpha territorialis Baehr, 1992 (Australia)
- Sphallomorpha thouzeti (Laporte, 1867) (Australia)
- Sphallomorpha thouzetoides Baehr, 1992 (Australia)
- Sphallomorpha tolgae Baehr, 1992 (Australia)
- Sphallomorpha torresia Baehr, 1992 (Australia)
- Sphallomorpha tozeria Baehr, 1992 (Australia)
- Sphallomorpha transversalis Baehr, 1992 (Australia)
- Sphallomorpha triangularis Baehr, 2009 (Australia)
- Sphallomorpha tropica Baehr, 1992 (Australia)
- Sphallomorpha tropicalis Baehr, 1992 (Australia)
- Sphallomorpha unicolor Baehr, 1992 (Australia)
- Sphallomorpha uniformis Baehr, 1992 (Australia)
- Sphallomorpha unita Darlington, 1968
- Sphallomorpha uptoni Baehr, 1992 (Australia)
- Sphallomorpha versicolor Baehr, 1992 (Australia)
- Sphallomorpha viridis Baehr, 1992 (Australia)
- Sphallomorpha v-lineata Baehr, 1992 (Australia)
- Sphallomorpha vratislavi Baehr, 2020 (Australia)
- Sphallomorpha weiri Baehr, 1992 (Australia)
- Sphallomorpha westralis Baehr, 1992 (Australia)
- Sphallomorpha westwoodi (Notman, 1925) (Australia)
- Sphallomorpha wilgae Baehr, 1992 (Australia)
