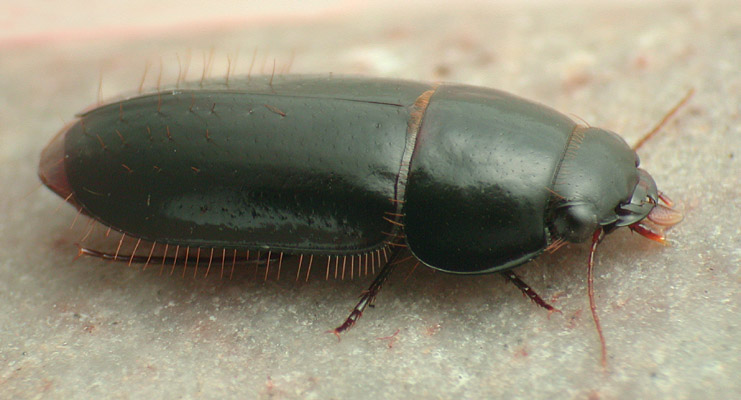
- Pseudomorpha vandykei

Scientific classification
- Domain: Eukaryota
- Kingdom: Animalia
- Phylum: Arthropoda
- Class: Insecta
- Order: Coleoptera
- Suborder: Adephaga
- Family: Carabidae
- Subfamily: Pseudomorphinae
- Genus: Pseudomorpha; Kirby, 1823

= Pseudomorpha =

Genus of beetles

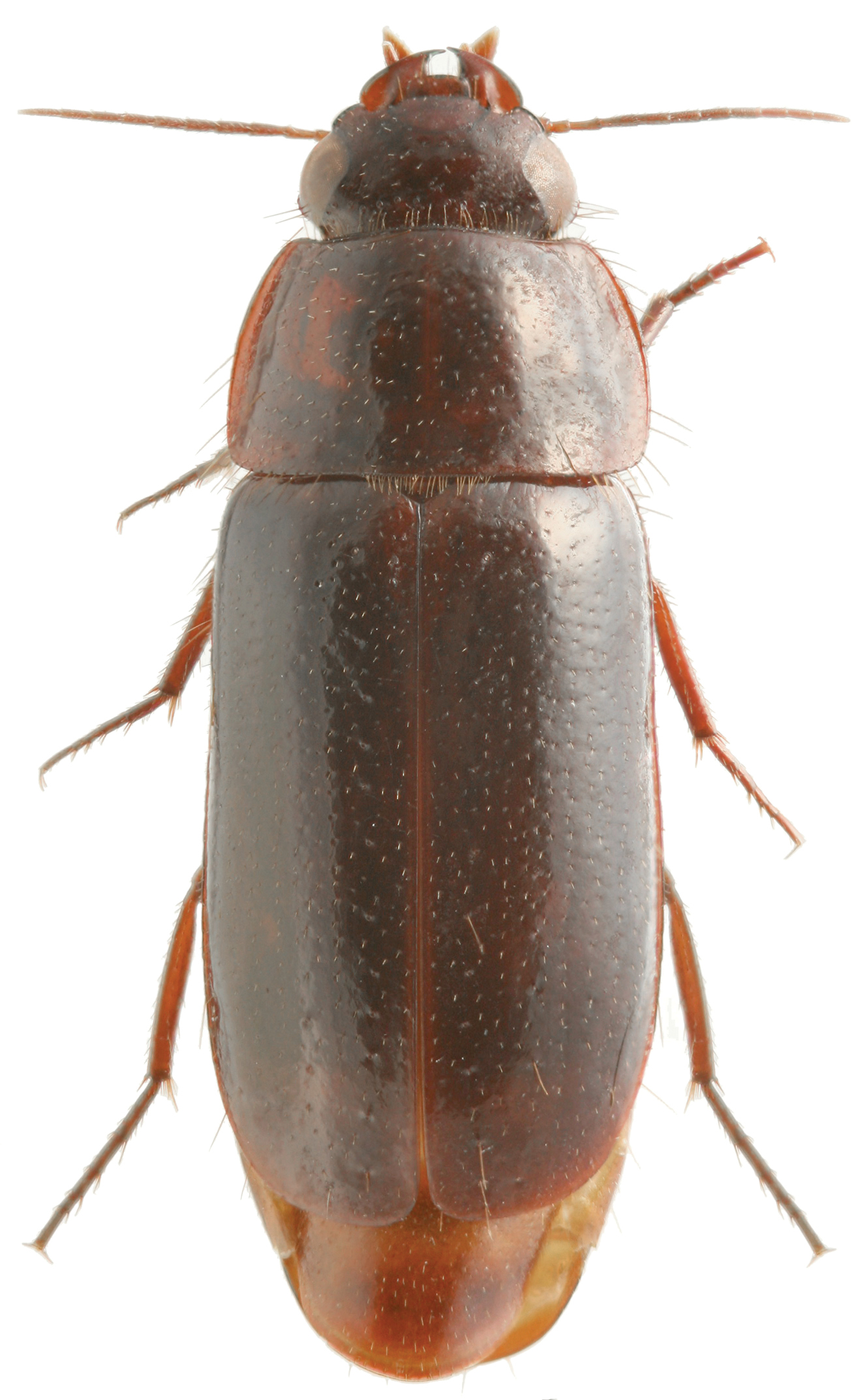
Pseudomorpha sp.

Pseudomorpha is a genus of beetles in the family Carabidae, found in North, Central, and South America.

== Species ==
These 35 species belong to the genus Pseudomorpha:

- Pseudomorpha alleni Van Dyke, 1953
- Pseudomorpha alutacea Notman, 1925
- Pseudomorpha argentina Steinheil, 1869
- Pseudomorpha arrowi Notman, 1925
- Pseudomorpha augustata G.Horn, 1883
- Pseudomorpha behrensi G.Horn, 1870
- Pseudomorpha brevis Baehr, 1997
- Pseudomorpha caribbeana Darlington, 1936
- Pseudomorpha castanea Casey, 1909
- Pseudomorpha champlaini Notman, 1925
- Pseudomorpha confusa Notman, 1925
- Pseudomorpha consanguinea Notman, 1925
- Pseudomorpha cronkhitei G.Horn, 1867
- Pseudomorpha cylindrica Casey, 1889
- Pseudomorpha excrucians Kirby, 1823
- Pseudomorpha falli Notman, 1925
- Pseudomorpha gerstaeckeri Chaudoir, 1877
- Pseudomorpha huachinera Amundson & Erwin, 2013
- Pseudomorpha hubbardi Notman, 1925
- Pseudomorpha insignis (Sloane, 1910)
- Pseudomorpha lacordairei (Dejean & Boisduval, 1829)
- Pseudomorpha parallela Van Dyke, 1943
- Pseudomorpha patagonia Erwin & Amundson, 2013
- Pseudomorpha penablanca Amundson & Erwin, 2013
- Pseudomorpha peninsularis Van Dyke, 1953
- Pseudomorpha pilatei Chaudoir, 1862
- Pseudomorpha pima Amundson & Erwin, 2013
- Pseudomorpha santacruz Erwin & Amundson, 2013
- Pseudomorpha santarita Erwin & Amundson, 2013
- Pseudomorpha schwarzi Notman, 1925
- Pseudomorpha subangulata Baehr, 1997
- Pseudomorpha tenebroides Notman, 1925
- Pseudomorpha vandykei Notman, 1925
- Pseudomorpha vicina Notman, 1925
- Pseudomorpha vindicata Notman, 1925
