= Notagonum anceps =

Scientific classification
- Kingdom: Animalia
- Phylum: Arthropoda
- Class: Insecta
- Order: Coleoptera
- Suborder: Adephaga
- Family: Carabidae
- Genus: Notagonum
- Species: N. anceps

Binomial name
- Notagonum anceps (Jedlicka, 1934)

Species of ground beetle

Notagonum anceps is a species of ground beetle in the subfamily Platyninae. It was described by Jedlicka in 1934.
