= Notagonum delaruei =

Scientific classification
- Kingdom: Animalia
- Phylum: Arthropoda
- Class: Insecta
- Order: Coleoptera
- Suborder: Adephaga
- Family: Carabidae
- Genus: Notagonum
- Species: N. delaruei

Binomial name
- Notagonum delaruei Liebherr, 2005

Species of beetle

Notagonum delaruei is a species of ground beetle in the subfamily Platyninae. It was described by Liebherr in 2005.
