= Notagonum lafertei =

Scientific classification
- Domain: Eukaryota
- Kingdom: Animalia
- Phylum: Arthropoda
- Class: Insecta
- Order: Coleoptera
- Suborder: Adephaga
- Family: Carabidae
- Genus: Notagonum
- Species: N. lafertei

Binomial name
- Notagonum lafertei (Montrouzier, 1860)

Species of beetle

Notagonum lafertei is a species of ground beetle in the subfamily Platyninae. It was described by Xavier Montrouzier in 1860.
