= Notagonum novaeguineae =

Scientific classification
- Domain: Eukaryota
- Kingdom: Animalia
- Phylum: Arthropoda
- Class: Insecta
- Order: Coleoptera
- Suborder: Adephaga
- Family: Carabidae
- Genus: Notagonum
- Species: N. novaeguineae

Binomial name
- Notagonum novaeguineae (Maindron, 1908)

Species of beetle

Notagonum novaeguineae is a species of ground beetle in the subfamily Platyninae. It was described by Maindron in 1908.
