= Notagonum oxypterum =

Scientific classification
- Domain: Eukaryota
- Kingdom: Animalia
- Phylum: Arthropoda
- Class: Insecta
- Order: Coleoptera
- Suborder: Adephaga
- Family: Carabidae
- Genus: Notagonum
- Species: N. oxypterum

Binomial name
- Notagonum oxypterum Louwerens, 1955

Species of beetle

Notagonum oxypterum is a species of ground beetle in the subfamily Platyninae. It was described by Louwerens in 1955.
