= Notagonum pleurale =

Scientific classification
- Domain: Eukaryota
- Kingdom: Animalia
- Phylum: Arthropoda
- Class: Insecta
- Order: Coleoptera
- Suborder: Adephaga
- Family: Carabidae
- Genus: Notagonum
- Species: N. pleurale

Binomial name
- Notagonum pleurale (Jordan, 1894)

Species of beetle

Notagonum pleurale is a species of ground beetle in the subfamily Platyninae. It was described by Karl Jordan in 1894.
