= Notagonum macleayi =

Scientific classification
- Kingdom: Animalia
- Phylum: Arthropoda
- Class: Insecta
- Order: Coleoptera
- Suborder: Adephaga
- Family: Carabidae
- Genus: Notagonum
- Species: N. macleayi

Binomial name
- Notagonum macleayi (Sloane, 1910)

Species of beetle

Notagonum macleayi is a species of ground beetle in the subfamily Platyninae. It was described by Sloane in 1910.
