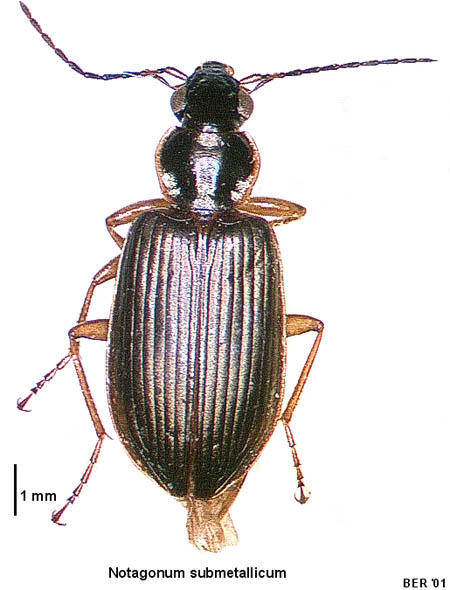

Scientific classification
- Domain: Eukaryota
- Kingdom: Animalia
- Phylum: Arthropoda
- Class: Insecta
- Order: Coleoptera
- Suborder: Adephaga
- Family: Carabidae
- Subfamily: Platyninae
- Tribe: Platynini
- Subtribe: Platynina
- Genus: Notagonum
- Species: N. submetallicum

Binomial name
- Notagonum submetallicum ( White, 1846)

= Notagonum submetallicum =

Species of beetle

Notagonum submetallicum is a species of ground beetle in the subfamily Platyninae. It was described by Adam White in 1846.

== Description ==
Notagonum submetallicum is a beetle ranging from 8.6 to 10.4 mm long. The head is greenish black, the pronotum and elytra are mostly greenish brown, and the antennae are yellowish on the first three segments and brownish on the remaining eight segments. The pronotum is slightly cordate, widest before the middle of its length and has lateral depressions that are wide throughout its length. The elytra have impunctate striae. The legs are very long and yellowish.

== Habitat ==
This species occurs at a range of altitudes from lowlands through to montane areas. It can be found on the soil surface (epigean), within the soil (fossorial) or on trees and shrubs (arboreal).

== Diet and behaviour ==
Notagonum submetallicum is a predator that feeds on sandhoppers. It is also known to occasionally eat strawberry seeds.

These beetles are swift runners and also capable of flight. They often fly to artificial lights at night and are also abundant in seashore drift (that they have presumably flown to).

The species is nocturnal. During the day, N. submetallicum hide at the bases of plants, under plant debris, under stones, and in soil cracks and burrows.

== Predators and parasites ==
Starlings prey on N. submetallicum. Parasites include mites and Laboulbeniales fungi.
