= Notagonum piceum =

Scientific classification
- Domain: Eukaryota
- Kingdom: Animalia
- Phylum: Arthropoda
- Class: Insecta
- Order: Coleoptera
- Suborder: Adephaga
- Family: Carabidae
- Genus: Notagonum
- Species: N. piceum

Binomial name
- Notagonum piceum Louwerens, 1962

Species of beetle

Notagonum piceum is a species of ground beetle in the subfamily Platyninae. It was described by Louwerens in 1962.
