= Notagonum macrops =

Scientific classification
- Domain: Eukaryota
- Kingdom: Animalia
- Phylum: Arthropoda
- Class: Insecta
- Order: Coleoptera
- Suborder: Adephaga
- Family: Carabidae
- Genus: Notagonum
- Species: N. macrops

Binomial name
- Notagonum macrops (Louwerens, 1955)

Species of beetle

Notagonum macrops is a species of ground beetle in the subfamily Platyninae. It was described by Louwerens in 1955.
