= Notagonum ambulator =

Scientific classification
- Domain: Eukaryota
- Kingdom: Animalia
- Phylum: Arthropoda
- Class: Insecta
- Order: Coleoptera
- Suborder: Adephaga
- Family: Carabidae
- Genus: Notagonum
- Species: N. ambulator

Binomial name
- Notagonum ambulator Darlington, 1971

Species of beetle

Notagonum ambulator is a species of ground beetle in the subfamily Platyninae. It was described by Darlington in 1971.
