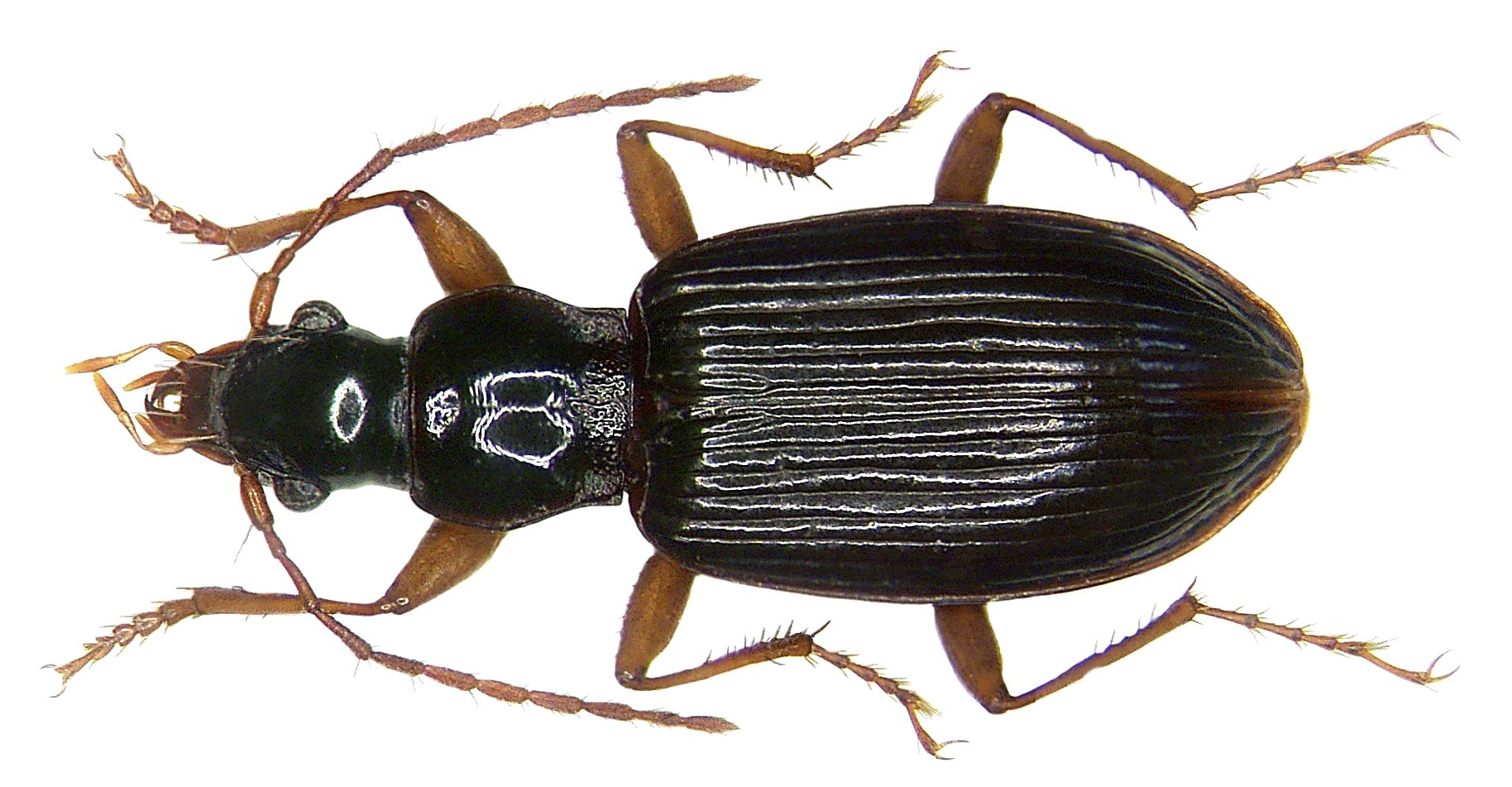
- Notagonum weigeli

Scientific classification
- Domain: Eukaryota
- Kingdom: Animalia
- Phylum: Arthropoda
- Class: Insecta
- Order: Coleoptera
- Suborder: Adephaga
- Family: Carabidae
- Subfamily: Platyninae
- Tribe: Platynini
- Subtribe: Platynina
- Genus: Notagonum; Darlington, 1952

= Notagonum =

Genus of beetles

Notagonum is a genus in the beetle family Carabidae. There are more than 80 described species in Notagonum.

== Species ==
These 85 species belong to the genus Notagonum:

- Notagonum addendum Darlington, 1952 (Indonesia and New Guinea)
- Notagonum aitape Darlington, 1952 (Indonesia and New Guinea)
- Notagonum albertisi (Maindron, 1906) (New Guinea)
- Notagonum altum Darlington, 1952 (Indonesia and New Guinea)
- Notagonum ambulator Darlington, 1971 (New Guinea)
- Notagonum anceps (Jedlicka, 1934) (Philippines)
- Notagonum angulum Darlington, 1952 (Indonesia and New Guinea)
- Notagonum angustellum Darlington, 1952 (Indonesia, New Guinea, and Papua)
- Notagonum angusticolle Baehr, 2017 (Indonesia)
- Notagonum anops (Jedlicka, 1934) (Philippines)
- Notagonum arveense Baehr, 2016 (Australia)
- Notagonum astrum Darlington, 1971 (Indonesia and New Guinea)
- Notagonum caritum Darlington, 1970
- Notagonum chathamense (Broun, 1909) (New Zealand)
- Notagonum circumdatum (Andrewes, 1930) (Myanmar, Malaysia, Indonesia, and Borneo)
- Notagonum crenulipenne Baehr, 2010 (Indonesia and New Guinea)
- Notagonum curiosum Darlington, 1971 (New Guinea)
- Notagonum darlingtoni Baehr, 2010 (New Guinea and Papua)
- Notagonum delaruei Liebherr, 2005 (Vanuatu)
- Notagonum dentellum Darlington, 1952 (Indonesia, New Guinea, and Australia)
- Notagonum devosi Baehr, 2010 (Indonesia and New Guinea)
- Notagonum drescheri Louwerens, 1956 (Indonesia)
- Notagonum exactum Darlington, 1971 (New Guinea)
- Notagonum excisipenne Baehr, 2010 (Indonesia, New Guinea, and Papua)
- Notagonum externum Darlington, 1952 (Indonesia and New Guinea)
- Notagonum feredayi (Bates, 1874) (New Zealand)
- Notagonum fuscipes Baehr, 2010 (Indonesia and New Guinea)
- Notagonum garainae Baehr, 2010 (New Guinea and Papua)
- Notagonum gibbum Darlington, 1952 (Indonesia and New Guinea)
- Notagonum gorokae Baehr, 2010 (New Guinea and Papua)
- Notagonum hamatum Baehr, 2010 (Indonesia and New Guinea)
- Notagonum ilagae Baehr, 2010 (Indonesia and New Guinea)
- Notagonum inerme (Andrewes, 1937) (Indonesia)
- Notagonum iridius Darlington, 1952 (New Guinea)
- Notagonum kitchingi Baehr, 2010 (Indonesia, New Guinea, and Papua)
- Notagonum lackneri Baehr, 2010 (Indonesia and New Guinea)
- Notagonum lafertei (Montrouzier, 1860) (New Caledonia, Vanuatu, and Australia)
- Notagonum laglaizei (Maindron, 1908) (Indonesia and New Guinea)
- Notagonum laticolle Baehr, 2010 (Indonesia and New Guinea)
- Notagonum lawsoni (Bates, 1874) (New Zealand)
- Notagonum luzonense (Jedlicka, 1935) (Philippines)
- Notagonum macleayi (Sloane, 1910) (Australia)
- Notagonum macrophthalmum Baehr, 2010 (Indonesia, New Guinea, and Papua)
- Notagonum macrops (Louwerens, 1955) (Indonesia and Borneo)
- Notagonum malkini Darlington, 1952 (Indonesia and New Guinea)
- Notagonum margaritum Darlington, 1952 (Indonesia and New Guinea)
- Notagonum marginale Baehr, 2010 (Indonesia and New Guinea)
- Notagonum marginellum (Erichson, 1842) (Australia)
- Notagonum marginicolle (W.J.MacLeay, 1871) (Indonesia, New Guinea, and Australia)
- Notagonum moluccense Louwerens, 1956 (Indonesia)
- Notagonum mucidum (Jedlicka, 1934) (Philippines)
- Notagonum murrayense (Blackburn, 1890) (Australia)
- Notagonum nigrellum Darlington, 1956 (Australia)
- Notagonum nigrinum Baehr, 2010 (Indonesia and New Guinea)
- Notagonum novaeguineae (Maindron, 1908) (Indonesia and New Guinea)
- Notagonum oxypterum Louwerens, 1955 (Indonesia)
- Notagonum paludum Darlington, 1952 (New Guinea)
- Notagonum parvicolle Baehr, 2010 (New Guinea and Papua)
- Notagonum pereus (Jedlicka, 1934) (Philippines)
- Notagonum pernitidum Baehr, 2008 (Indonesia and New Guinea)
- Notagonum piceum Louwerens, 1962 (Indonesia)
- Notagonum pleurale (Jordan, 1894) (Indonesia)
- Notagonum quadruum Darlington, 1971 (Indonesia and New Guinea)
- Notagonum reidi Baehr, 2017 (Indonesia)
- Notagonum reversior Darlington, 1952 (Indonesia and New Guinea)
- Notagonum reversum Darlington, 1952 (New Guinea)
- Notagonum schuelei Baehr, 2010 (Indonesia and New Guinea)
- Notagonum sectum Darlington, 1971 (New Guinea)
- Notagonum sigi Darlington, 1952 (Indonesia and New Guinea)
- Notagonum sinuum Darlington, 1952 (Indonesia and New Guinea)
- Notagonum skalei Baehr, 2010 (Indonesia and New Guinea)
- Notagonum spinulum Darlington, 1952 (New Guinea)
- Notagonum subangulum Darlington, 1952 (Indonesia and New Guinea)
- Notagonum subimpressum Darlington, 1952 (Indonesia and New Guinea)
- Notagonum submetallicum (White, 1846) (New Zealand)
- Notagonum subnigrum Darlington, 1952 (New Guinea and Papua)
- Notagonum subpunctum Darlington, 1952 (Indonesia and New Guinea)
- Notagonum subrufum Darlington, 1952 (Indonesia and New Guinea)
- Notagonum subspinulum Darlington, 1952 (New Guinea)
- Notagonum tasmanicum Baehr, 2016 (Australia)
- Notagonum ullrichi Baehr, 2010 (New Guinea and Papua)
- Notagonum undatum (Andrewes, 1937) (Indonesia)
- Notagonum vaporum Darlington, 1952 (Indonesia and New Guinea)
- Notagonum vile Darlington, 1952 (Southeast Asia, Oceania)
- Notagonum weigeli Baehr, 2008 (Indonesia and New Guinea)
