= Notagonum inerme =

Scientific classification
- Domain: Eukaryota
- Kingdom: Animalia
- Phylum: Arthropoda
- Class: Insecta
- Order: Coleoptera
- Suborder: Adephaga
- Family: Carabidae
- Genus: Notagonum
- Species: N. inerme

Binomial name
- Notagonum inerme (Andrewes, 1937)

Species of beetle

Notagonum inerme is a species of ground beetle in the subfamily Platyninae. It was described by Andrewes in 1937.
