= Notagonum marginellum =

Scientific classification
- Kingdom: Animalia
- Phylum: Arthropoda
- Class: Insecta
- Order: Coleoptera
- Suborder: Adephaga
- Family: Carabidae
- Genus: Notagonum
- Species: N. marginellum

Binomial name
- Notagonum marginellum (Erichson, 1842)

Species of beetle

Notagonum marginellum is a species of ground beetle in the subfamily Platyninae. It was described by Wilhelm Ferdinand Erichson in 1842.
