= Cainogenion =

Scientific classification
- Domain: Eukaryota
- Kingdom: Animalia
- Phylum: Arthropoda
- Class: Insecta
- Order: Coleoptera
- Suborder: Adephaga
- Family: Carabidae
- Subfamily: Pseudomorphinae
- Genus: Cainogenion; Notman, 1925

Subgenera
- Cainogenion Notman, 1925; Procainogenion Baehr, 1997

Synonyms
- Procainogenion Baehr, 1997

Genus of beetles

Cainogenion is a genus of carabids in the beetle family Carabidae. There are about 12 described species in Cainogenion, found in Australia.

== Species ==
These 12 species belong to the genus Cainogenion:

- Cainogenion clypeale Baehr, 1997
- Cainogenion creberrimum (Blackburn, 1901)
- Cainogenion depressum Baehr, 1997
- Cainogenion ephippiatum (Newman, 1856)
- Cainogenion glabratum Baehr, 1997
- Cainogenion interiore Baehr, 1997
- Cainogenion ipsoides (Westwood, 1840)
- Cainogenion obscurum (Laporte, 1867)
- Cainogenion parumpilosum Baehr, 1997
- Cainogenion rotundicolle Baehr, 1997
- Cainogenion subopacum (W.J.MacLeay, 1871)
- Cainogenion tropicum Baehr, 1997
