= Notagonum anops =

Scientific classification
- Domain: Eukaryota
- Kingdom: Animalia
- Phylum: Arthropoda
- Class: Insecta
- Order: Coleoptera
- Suborder: Adephaga
- Family: Carabidae
- Genus: Notagonum
- Species: N. anops

Binomial name
- Notagonum anops (Jedlicka, 1934)

Species of beetle

Notagonum anops is a species of ground beetle in the subfamily Platyninae. It was described by Jedlicka in 1934.
