= Cryptocephalomorpha =

Scientific classification
- Domain: Eukaryota
- Kingdom: Animalia
- Phylum: Arthropoda
- Class: Insecta
- Order: Coleoptera
- Suborder: Adephaga
- Family: Carabidae
- Subfamily: Pseudomorphinae
- Genus: Cryptocephalomorpha; Ritsema, 1875

Genus of beetles

Cryptocephalomorpha is a genus of beetles in the family Carabidae, containing the following species:

- Cryptocephalomorpha australica Baehr, 1997 (Australia)
- Cryptocephalomorpha collaris (C.O.Waterhouse, 1877) (Thailand and Philippines)
- Cryptocephalomorpha gaverei Ritsema, 1875 (Laos, Singapore, Indonesia, Borneo, and Philippines)
- Cryptocephalomorpha genieri Baehr, 1997 (Zambia, Botswana, and South Africa)
- Cryptocephalomorpha gigantea Baehr, 2002 (Indonesia and Borneo)
- Cryptocephalomorpha indica Baehr, 2013 (India)
- Cryptocephalomorpha laosensis Baehr, 2013 (Laos)
- Cryptocephalomorpha maior Baehr, 1997 (Thailand, Laos, and Vietnam)
- Cryptocephalomorpha maxima Baehr, 2009 (Laos)
- Cryptocephalomorpha ovalis Baehr, 2013 (Malaysia)
- Cryptocephalomorpha papua Darlington, 1968 (New Guinea, Papua, and the Solomon Islands)

One of the characteristics of the genus Cryptocephalomorpha is that the labrum is not visible but hidden under the head.
