= Pseudoclivina testacea =

Scientific classification
- Domain: Eukaryota
- Kingdom: Animalia
- Phylum: Arthropoda
- Class: Insecta
- Order: Coleoptera
- Suborder: Adephaga
- Family: Carabidae
- Subfamily: Scaritinae
- Tribe: Clivinini
- Subtribe: Sparostesina
- Genus: Pseudoclivina
- Species: P. testacea

Binomial name
- Pseudoclivina testacea (Putzeys, 1846)

Synonyms
- Clivina testacea Putzeys, 1846

Species of beetle

Pseudoclivina testacea is a species of ground beetle in the family Carabidae, found in West Africa.
