= Notagonum murrayense =

Scientific classification
- Domain: Eukaryota
- Kingdom: Animalia
- Phylum: Arthropoda
- Class: Insecta
- Order: Coleoptera
- Suborder: Adephaga
- Family: Carabidae
- Genus: Notagonum
- Species: N. murrayense

Binomial name
- Notagonum murrayense (Blackburn, 1890)

Species of beetle

Notagonum murrayense is a species of ground beetle in the subfamily Platyninae. It was described by Blackburn in 1890.
