= Notagonum albertisi =

Scientific classification
- Domain: Eukaryota
- Kingdom: Animalia
- Phylum: Arthropoda
- Class: Insecta
- Order: Coleoptera
- Suborder: Adephaga
- Family: Carabidae
- Genus: Notagonum
- Species: N. albertisi

Binomial name
- Notagonum albertisi (Maindron, 1906)

Species of beetle

Notagonum albertisi is a species of ground beetle in the subfamily Platyninae. It was described by Maindron in 1906.
