= Pseudoclivina calida =

Scientific classification
- Kingdom: Animalia
- Phylum: Arthropoda
- Class: Insecta
- Order: Coleoptera
- Suborder: Adephaga
- Family: Carabidae
- Subfamily: Scaritinae
- Tribe: Clivinini
- Subtribe: Sparostesina
- Genus: Pseudoclivina
- Species: P. calida

Binomial name
- Pseudoclivina calida (Putzeys, 1866)

Synonyms
- Clivina calida (Putzeys, 1866)

Species of beetle

Pseudoclivina calida is a species of ground beetle in the family Carabidae, found in Sudan.
