= Notagonum circumdatum =

Scientific classification
- Domain: Eukaryota
- Kingdom: Animalia
- Phylum: Arthropoda
- Class: Insecta
- Order: Coleoptera
- Suborder: Adephaga
- Family: Carabidae
- Genus: Notagonum
- Species: N. circumdatum

Binomial name
- Notagonum circumdatum (Andrewes, 1930)

Species of beetle

Notagonum circumdatum is a species of ground beetle in the subfamily Platyninae. It was described by Andrewes in 1930.
