= Notagonum feredayi =

Scientific classification
- Domain: Eukaryota
- Kingdom: Animalia
- Phylum: Arthropoda
- Class: Insecta
- Order: Coleoptera
- Suborder: Adephaga
- Family: Carabidae
- Genus: Notagonum
- Species: N. feredayi

Binomial name
- Notagonum feredayi (Bates, 1874)

Species of beetle

Notagonum feredayi is a species of ground beetle in the subfamily Platyninae. It was described by Henry Walter Bates in 1874.
