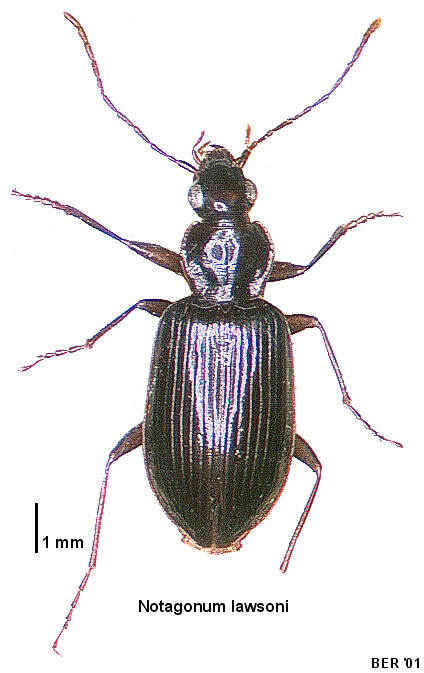

Scientific classification
- Kingdom: Animalia
- Phylum: Arthropoda
- Class: Insecta
- Order: Coleoptera
- Suborder: Adephaga
- Family: Carabidae
- Genus: Notagonum
- Species: N. lawsoni

Binomial name
- Notagonum lawsoni (Bates, 1874)

= Notagonum lawsoni =

Species of beetle

Notagonum lawsoni is a species of ground beetle in the subfamily Platyninae. It is endemic to New Zealand. It was described by Bates in 1874. Notagonum lawsoni has been collected from Metrosideros excelsa through the beating of foliage.
