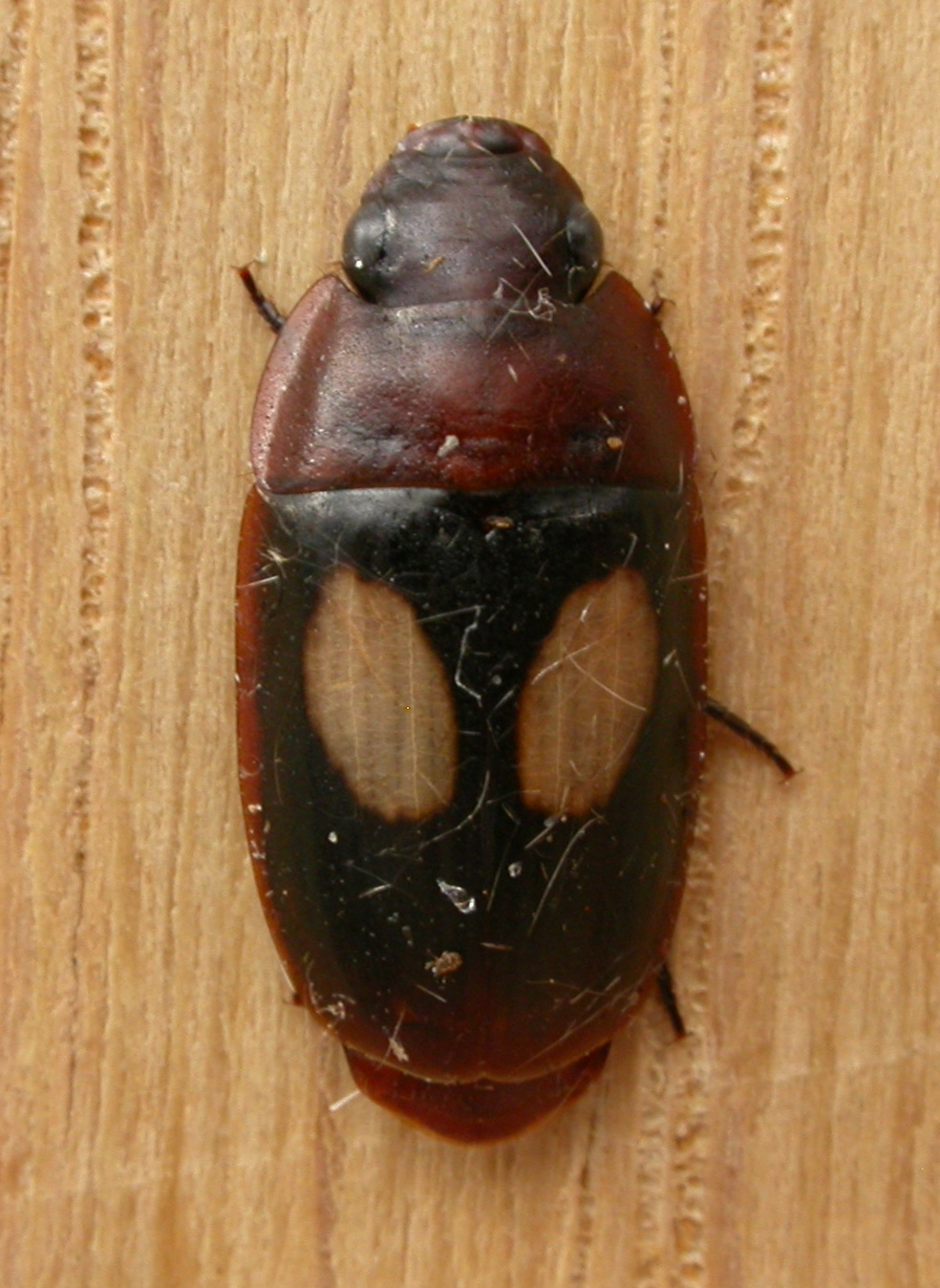
- Sphallomorpha ruficollis

Scientific classification
- Domain: Eukaryota
- Kingdom: Animalia
- Phylum: Arthropoda
- Class: Insecta
- Order: Coleoptera
- Suborder: Adephaga
- Family: Carabidae
- Subfamily: Pseudomorphinae; Hope, 1838

= Pseudomorphinae =

Subfamily of beetles

Pseudomorphinae is a subfamily of ground beetles in the family Carabidae. There are about 12 genera and at least 360 described species in Pseudomorphinae.

== Genera ==
These 12 genera belong to the subfamily Pseudomorphinae:

- Adelotopus Hope, 1836
- Cainogenion Notman, 1925
- Cryptocephalomorpha Ritsema, 1875
- Guyanemorpha Erwin, 2013
- Manumorpha Erwin & Geraci, 2008
- Notopseudomorpha Baehr, 1997
- Paussotropus C.O.Waterhouse, 1877
- Pseudomorpha Kirby, 1823
- Samiriamorpha Erwin & Geraci, 2008
- Sphallomorpha Westwood, 1840
- Tuxtlamorpha Erwin & Geraci, 2008
- Yasunimorpha Erwin & Geraci, 2008
