= Paussotropus =

Scientific classification
- Domain: Eukaryota
- Kingdom: Animalia
- Phylum: Arthropoda
- Class: Insecta
- Order: Coleoptera
- Suborder: Adephaga
- Family: Carabidae
- Genus: Paussotropus; C.O.Waterhouse, 1877
- Species: P. cylindricus

Binomial name
- Paussotropus cylindricus (Chaudoir, 1862)

Genus of beetles

Paussotropus is a genus in the beetle family Carabidae. This genus has a single species, Paussotropus cylindricus. It is found in Australia.
