= Spixiana =

- Discipline: Zoology
- Language: English, German
- Edited by: Gerhard Haszprunar

Publication details
- History: 1977-present
- Publisher: Verlag Dr. Friedrich Pfeil on behalf of the Bavarian State Collection of Zoology (Germany)
- Frequency: Biannually
- Open access: Yes
- Impact factor: 0.442 (2019)

Standard abbreviations
- ISO 4: Spixiana

Indexing
- ISSN: 0341-8391
- OCLC no.: 807172511

Links
- Journal homepage; Online archive; Journal page at publisher's website

Spixiana is a biannual peer-reviewed scientific journal published by Verlag Dr. Friedrich Pfeil on behalf of the Bavarian State Collection of Zoology, covering research in zoology. Spixiana publishes original works in the fields of taxonomy, morphology, phylogeny, and zoogeography. It also publishes monographs in supplements.
