= Martin Baehr =

German entomologist (1943–2019)

Martin Baehr (10 March 1943 – 17 April 2019) was a German entomologist who mostly worked on ground beetles (Carabidae), but also spiders, grasshoppers and other taxa. He described and named more than 2,000 species, mostly from Southeast Asia and Australia. He studied biology at the university of Tübingen. His doctoral thesis was initially supervised by Willi Hennig, who then died before his graduation.

Baehr was curator at the Zoologische Staatssammlung München, at first in charge of Heteroptera and Orthoptera, later of Coleoptera. For many years he worked as the managing editor of the zoological journal Spixiana. One of his most comprehensive taxonomic revisions treated the subfamily Pseudomorphinae.

Baehr also wrote several non-academic books including Welcher Käfer ist das? (What Beetle is This?), published by Stuttgart-based publisher Kosmos.
