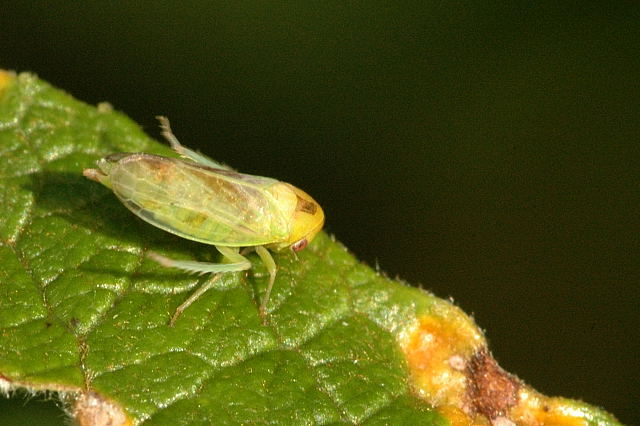
- Macropsis

Scientific classification
- Kingdom: Animalia
- Phylum: Arthropoda
- Clade: Pancrustacea
- Class: Insecta
- Order: Hemiptera
- Suborder: Auchenorrhyncha
- Family: Cicadellidae
- Subfamily: Eurymelinae
- Tribe: Macropsini; Evans, 1935

= Macropsini =

Tribe of true bugs

Macropsini is a tribe of leafhoppers in the family Cicadellidae, formerly treated as a subfamily but now considered to belong within the subfamily Eurymelinae.

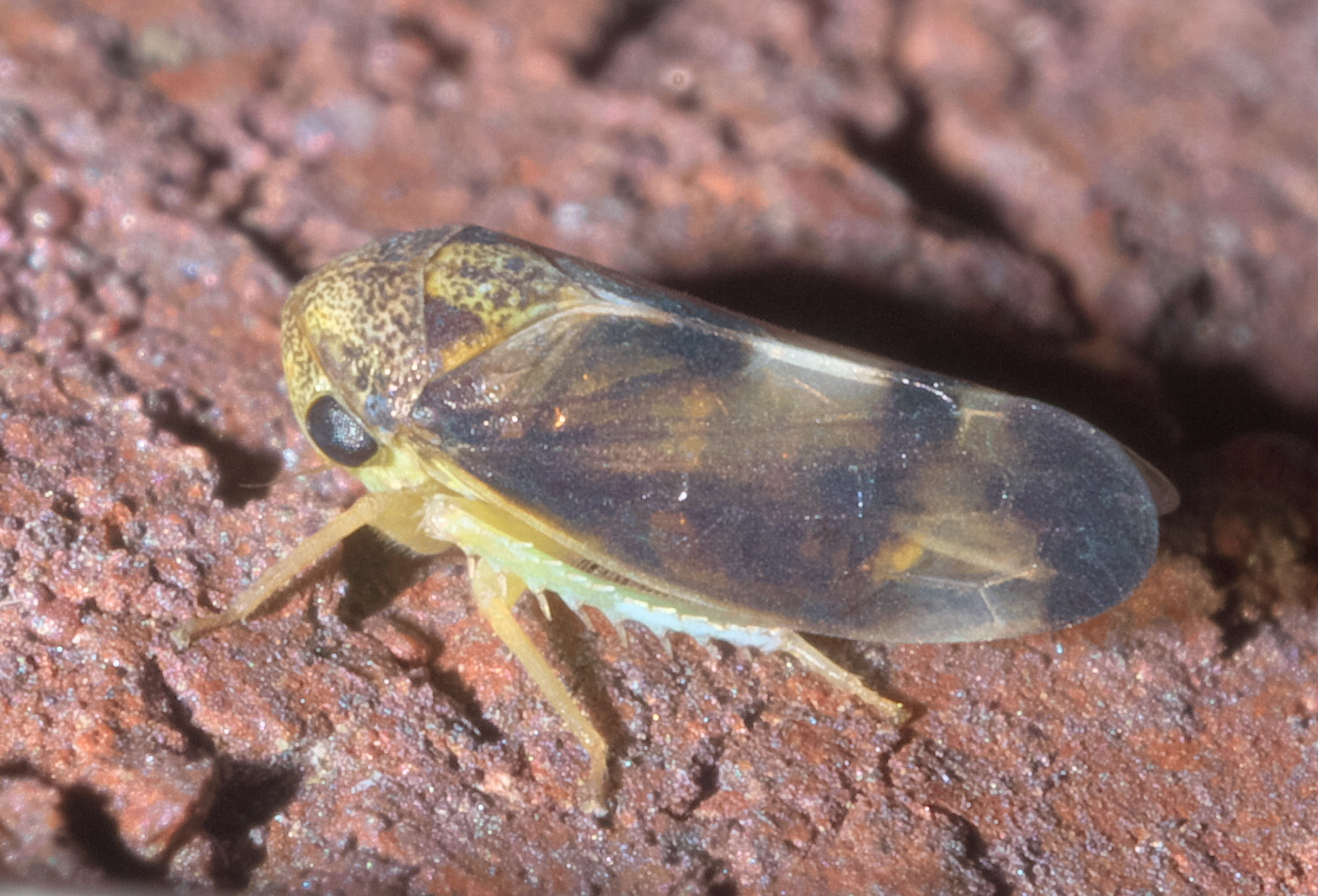
Pediopsoides distinctus

== Genera ==
- Archipedionis Dietrich & Thomas, 2018
- Galboa Distant, 1909
- Hephathus Ribaut, 1952
- Macropsella Hamilton, 1980
- Macropsis Lewis, 1834
- Macropsidius Ribaut, 1952
- Oncopsis Burmeister, 1838
- Paragalboa Yang, Dietrich & Zhang, 2016
- Pedionis Hamilton, 1980
- Pediopsis Burmeister, 1838
- Pediopsoides Matsumura, 1912
- Reticopsella Viraktamath, 1996
- Reticopsis Hamilton, 1980
- Ruandopsis Linnavuori, 1978
- Stenopsoides Evans, 1941
- Stenoscopus Evans, 1934
- Toropsis Hamilton, 1980
- Varicopsella Hamilton, 1980
- Zelopsis Evans, 1966
