= Idiocerini =

- Idiocerus stigmaticalis

Scientific classification
- Kingdom: Animalia
- Phylum: Arthropoda
- Clade: Pancrustacea
- Class: Insecta
- Order: Hemiptera
- Suborder: Auchenorrhyncha
- Family: Cicadellidae
- Subfamily: Eurymelinae
- Tribe: Idiocerini; Baker, 1915

Tribe of true bugs

Idiocerini is a tribe of leafhoppers that belongs to the family Cicadellidae, formerly treated as a subfamily, but now included within the subfamily Eurymelinae.

== Subtribes and genera ==
As of October 2026, BioLib includes subtribes:

subtribe Amritodina Zhang, 2006

1. Amritodus Anufriev, 1970
2. Anidiocerus Maldonado-Capriles, 1976
3. Bellacerus Viraktamath & Yeshwanth, 2024
4. Chinaica Bin Zhang, Ziyu Fu, Webb MD, 2026
5. Flexocerus Kuoh & Fang, 1985
6. Idioscopus Baker, 1915
7. Jogina Viraktamath & Yeshwanth, 2024
8. Keralus Viraktamath & Yeshwanth, 2024
9. Matangia Viraktamath & Yeshwanth, 2024
10. Neohyalinocerus Zhang, 2026
11. Neoidioscopus Huang & Maldonado-Capriles, 1992
12. Taiwanocerus Huang & Maldonado-Capriles, 1992
13. Ulavius Viraktamath & Yeshwanth, 2024

subtribe Idiocerina Baker, 1915

1. Acericerus Dlabola, 1974
2. Adiaerotoma Spinola, 1850
3. Austrocerus Evans, 1941
4. Balcanocerus Maldonado-Capriles, 1971
5. Balocharella Webb, 1983
6. Bharinka Webb, 1983
7. Bharoopra Webb, 1983
8. Bugraia Koçak, 1981
9. Bundabrilla Webb, 1983
10. Busoniomimus Maldonado-Capriles, 1977
11. Cafixia Webb, 1983
12. Chiasmodolon Dietrich, 1990
13. Chileanoscopus Freytag & Morrison, 1969
14. Dhongariva Webb, 1983
15. Dolichopscerus Maldonado-Capriles, 1985
16. Eutandra Webb, 1983
17. Gressittocerus Maldonado-Capriles, 1985
18. Grootonia Webb, 1983
19. Hatralixia Webb, 1983
20. Henanocerus Zhang & Wang, 2018
21. Hydabricta Webb, 1983
22. Idiocerella Evans, 1941
23. Idiocerus Lewis, 1834
24. Idionannus Linnavuori, 1956
25. Ipocerus Baker, 1915
26. Jogocerus Viraktamath, 1979
27. Kopamerra Webb, 1983
28. Lambirocerus Xue & Zhang, 2018
29. Maldonadora Webb, 1983
30. Maroopula Webb, 1983
31. Maynacerus Lozada, 1998
32. Mediocerus Freytag, 1990
33. Meroleucocerus Maldonado-Capriles, 1972
34. Metapocirtus O.G. Costa, 1834
35. Metidiocerus Ossiannilsson, 1981
36. Mexicanocerus Freytag, 1990
37. Musgraviella Evans, 1966
38. Nabicerus Kwon, 1985
39. Nilgiriscopus Viraktamath, 2007
40. Nyndgama Webb, 1983
41. Pandacerus Webb, 1983
42. Paraidioscopus Maldonado-Capriles, 1964
43. Pascoepus Webb, 1983
44. Pedioscopus Kirkaldy, 1906
45. Periacerus Viraktamath & Parvathi, 2002
46. Philippocerus Maldonado-Capriles, 1972
47. Philippogalla Xue, Mckamey & Zhan, . 2017
48. Podulmorinus Kwon, 1985
49. Populicerus Dlabola, 1974
50. Pretioscopus Webb, 1983
51. Quartauropa Webb, 1983
52. Quilopsus Webb, 1983
53. Remoya Webb, 1983
54. Rhusopus Webb, 1983
55. Rhytidodus Fieber, 1872
56. Rosopaella Webb, 1983
57. Rotifunkia China, 1926
58. Sahlbergotettix Zachvatkin, 1953
59. Stenidiocerus Ossiannilsson, 1981
60. Strongylomma Spinola, 1850
61. Sulamicerus Dlabola, 1974
62. Tasnimocerus Ghauri, 1975
63. Tautocerus Anufriev, 1971
64. Theronopus Webb, 1983
65. Tinderella Webb, 1983
66. Tomopennis Maldonado-Capriles, 1984
67. Tremulicerus Dlabola, 1974
68. Tumocerus Evans, 1941
69. Undophomorpha Xue & Zhang, 2018
70. Wiloatma Webb, 1983
71. Yachandra Webb, 1983
72. Zaletta Metcalf, 1952
73. Zinislopa Webb, 1983

subtribe unassigned

1. Burmascopus Viraktamath, 2007
2. Chinaocerus Zhang & Li, 2016
3. Dianica Zhang, 2018
4. †Eoidiocerus Dietrich & Thomas, 2018
5. Hespericerus Gnezdilov, 1999
6. Hyalinocerus Zhang & Li, 2012
7. Paramritodus Xue & Zhang, 2020
8. Viridicerus Dlabola, 1974
9. Xizangocerus Xue & Zhang, 2025
10. Yarlungocerus Xue & Zhang, 2025

Note

The subtribes Megipocerina Isaev, 1988 (based on genus Megipocerus Zachvatkin, 1945) and Busonina Zhang, 2015 (based on genus Busonia Distant, 1908) are now elevated to tribe Megipocerini.

=== Selected Genera ===
- Amritodus Anufriev, 1970
- Idiocerus Lewis, 1834
- Metidiocerus Ossiannilsson, 1981
- Populicerus Dlabola, 1974
- Sahlbergotettix Zachvatkin, 1953
- Stenidiocerus Ossiannilsson, 1981
- Tremulicerus Dlabola, 1974
