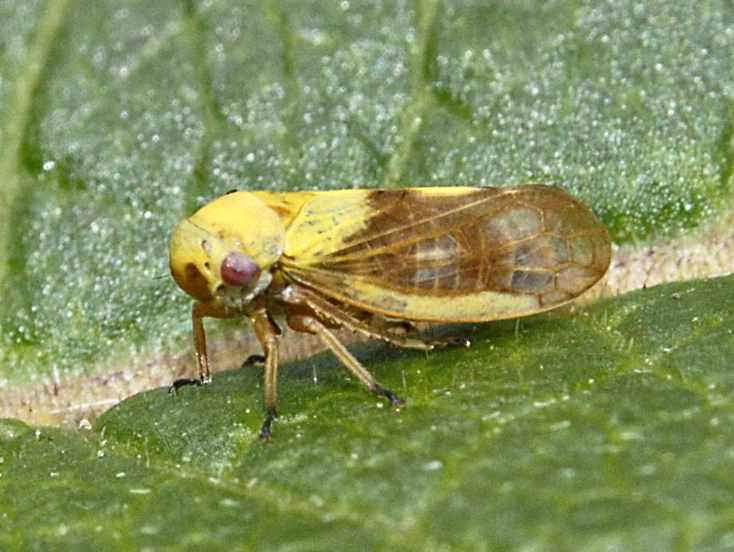
- Oncopsis cf. flavicollis, female

Scientific classification
- Kingdom: Animalia
- Phylum: Arthropoda
- Class: Insecta
- Order: Hemiptera
- Suborder: Auchenorrhyncha
- Family: Cicadellidae
- Genus: Oncopsis
- Species: O. flavicollis

Binomial name
- Oncopsis flavicollis (Linnaeus, 1761)

= Oncopsis flavicollis =

Species of true bug

Oncopsis flavicollis is a species of leafhoppers belonging to the family Cicadellidae subfamily Eurymelinae.

== Description ==
Oncopsis flavicollis can reach a length of about 4.5–5.5 millimetres (0.18–0.22 in). It is a sexual dimorph species. Males show dark markings on the face with round spots. Females are very variable, with different colour forms. Usually they are bright-yellow on the upper part of the face, on the forebody and on the base of the wings, while the remaining part of the wings are chestnut brown. Adult can be found in forest environment from May to September. These leafhoppers feeds on birch (Betula pendula and Betula pubescens).

== Distribution ==
This species can be found in most of Europe, in the Near East, in North Africa and in the eastern Palearctic realm.
