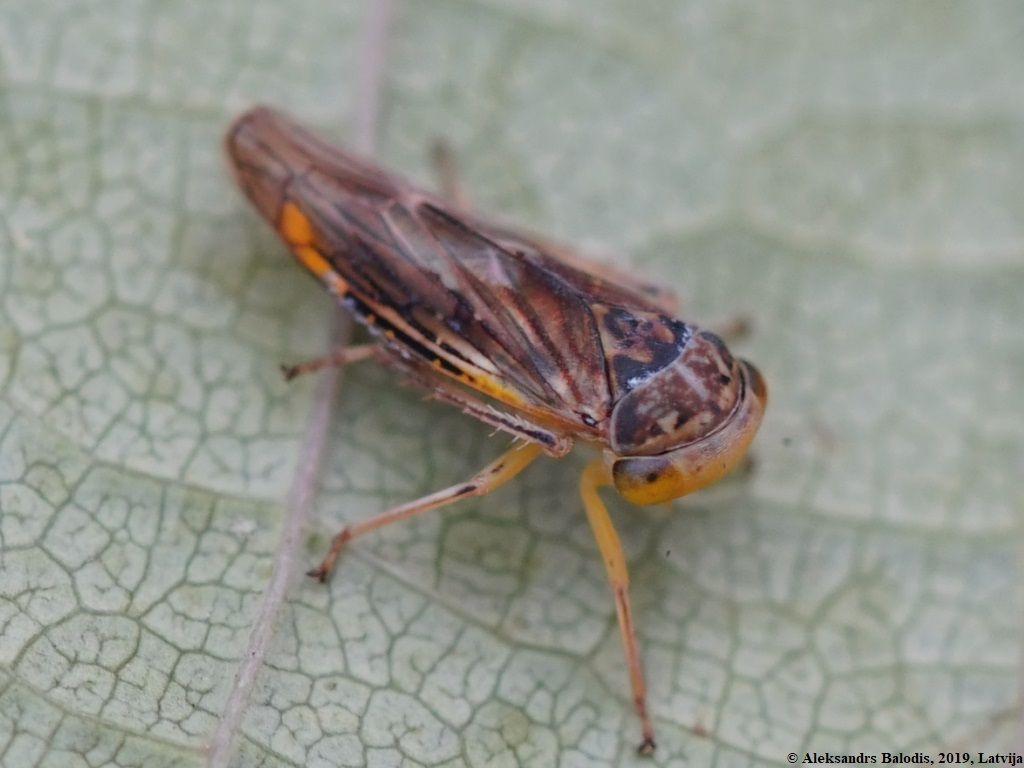
- Idiocerus stigmaticalis

Scientific classification
- Kingdom: Animalia
- Phylum: Arthropoda
- Clade: Pancrustacea
- Class: Insecta
- Order: Hemiptera
- Suborder: Auchenorrhyncha
- Family: Cicadellidae
- Tribe: Idiocerini
- Genus: Idiocerus; Lewis, 1834

Species
- See text.

= Idiocerus =

Genus of true bugs

Idiocerus is a large genus of Auchenorrhynchan bugs belonging to the family Cicadellidae (the leafhoppers) and typical of the tribe Idiocerini.

== Description ==
The group is characterised by a very short and broadly rounded vertex (head); many species are very similar and difficult to identify. Most are found on specific host plants, particularly poplars and willows. For instance the common European species I. vitreus is found exclusively on certain poplars; this and a number of others are found in the British Isles.

== Species ==
Species include:

Holarctic species

- Idiocerus stigmaticalis - type species

European species

- Idiocerus aaliensis
- Idiocerus affinis
- Idiocerus albicans
- Idiocerus confusus
- Idiocerus distinguendus
- Idiocerus elegans
- Idiocerus fulgidus
- Idiocerus herrichii
- Idiocerus humilis
- Idiocerus lambertiei
- Idiocerus laminatus
- Idiocerus lituratus
- Idiocerus maculicollis
- Idiocerus nitidissimus
- Idiocerus poecilus
- Idiocerus populi
- Idiocerus ribauti
- Idiocerus rutilans
- Idiocerus salgiris
- Idiocerus similis
- Idiocerus tremulae
- Idiocerus ustulatus
- Idiocerus vicinus
- Idiocerus vitreus
- Idiocerus vittifrons

Nearctic species

- Idiocerus albolinea
- Idiocerus alternatus
- Idiocerus amabilis
- Idiocerus apache
- Idiocerus aureus
- Idiocerus balli
- Idiocerus cabottii
- Idiocerus canae
- Idiocerus carolina
- Idiocerus catalinus
- Idiocerus cedrus
- Idiocerus cephalicus
- Idiocerus cinctus
- Idiocerus cognatus
- Idiocerus couleanus
- Idiocerus delongi
- Idiocerus depictus
- Idiocerus distinctus
- Idiocerus duzeei
- Idiocerus ensiger
- Idiocerus exilus
- Idiocerus femoratus
- Idiocerus freytagi
- Idiocerus gillettei
- Idiocerus immaculatus
- Idiocerus indistinctus
- Idiocerus inebrius
- Idiocerus interruptus
- Idiocerus iodes
- Idiocerus lachrymalis
- Idiocerus lucidae
- Idiocerus lunaris
- Idiocerus maximus
- Idiocerus midas
- Idiocerus moniliferae
- Idiocerus morosus
- Idiocerus musteus
- Idiocerus nervatus
- Idiocerus obispanus
- Idiocerus obsoletus
- Idiocerus obstinatus
- Idiocerus omani
- Idiocerus pallidus
- Idiocerus pericallis
- Idiocerus perplexus
- Idiocerus productus
- Idiocerus pyramidatus
- Idiocerus ramentosus
- Idiocerus raphus
- Idiocerus rotundens
- Idiocerus rufus
- Idiocerus setaceus
- Idiocerus snowi
- Idiocerus striola
- Idiocerus subnitens
- Idiocerus suturalis
- Idiocerus tahotus
- Idiocerus taiga
- Idiocerus taxodium
- Idiocerus texanus
- Idiocerus tonotonus
- Idiocerus unicolor
- Idiocerus vanduzeei
- Idiocerus varians
- Idiocerus venosus
- Idiocerus verticis
- Idiocerus xanthiops

Note

Species previously placed here may have been revised, such as Populicerus formosus (Ball, 1902)
