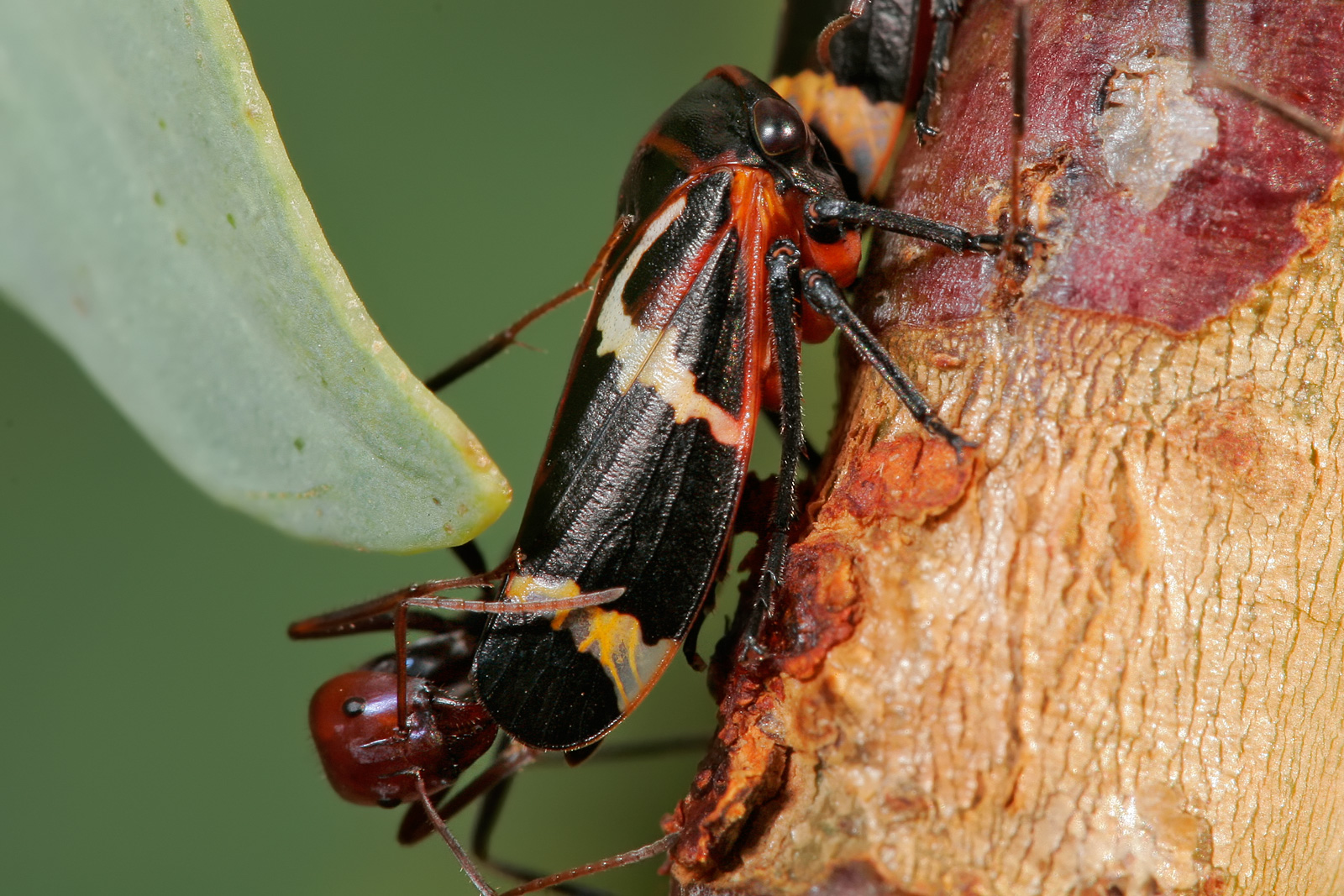
- Adult two-lined gum treehopper (Eurymeloides bicincta) demonstrating a symbiotic relationship with meat ants

Scientific classification
- Kingdom: Animalia
- Phylum: Arthropoda
- Clade: Pancrustacea
- Class: Insecta
- Order: Hemiptera
- Suborder: Auchenorrhyncha
- Family: Cicadellidae
- Subfamily: Eurymelinae; Amyot & Audinet-Serville, 1843

= Eurymelinae =

Subfamily of leafhoppers

Eurymelinae is a subfamily of leafhoppers (family Cicadellidae) with a worldwide distribution.

== Tribes and selected genera ==
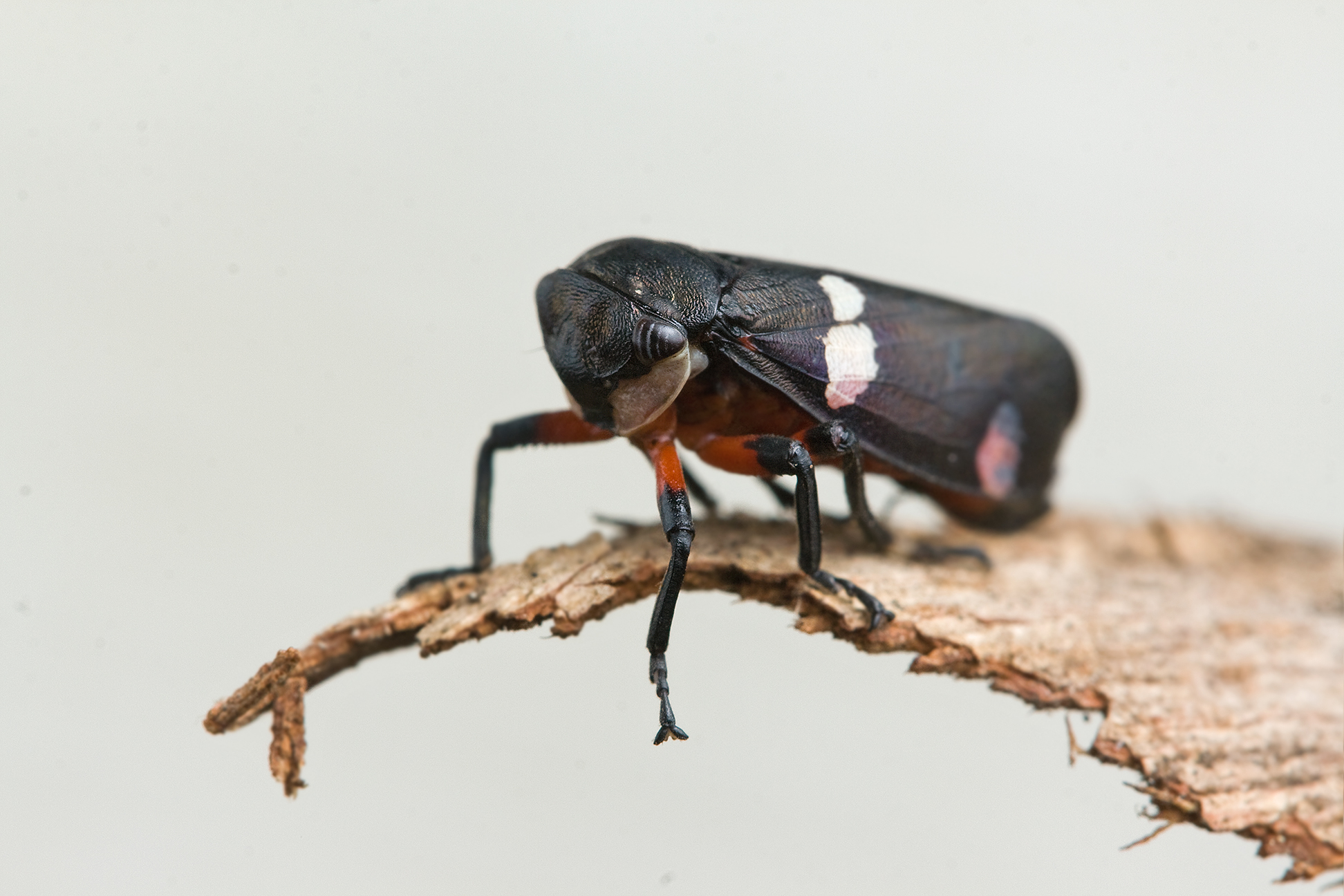
Eurymela distincta

The World Auchenorrhyncha Database includes:

Austroagalloidini

1. Austroagalloides Evans, 1936

Balocerini (SE Asia to Australia)

1. Balocerus Freytag & Morrison, 1972
2. Balocha Distant, 1908
3. Balocharella Webb, 1983
4. Bharinka Webb, 1983
5. Musgraviella Evans, 1966
6. Quilopsus Webb, 1983
7. Rosopaella Webb, 1983
8. Tumocerus Evans, 1942
9. Zaletta Metcalf, 1952

=== Chiasmodolini ===
Auyh.: Xue, Dietrich & Zhang, 2020; S. America

1. Adchunroides Maldonado-Capriles, 1977
2. Barolineocerus Freytag, 2008
3. Bolivianoscopus Lozada, 2010
4. Chiasmodolon Dietrich, 1990
5. Chunroides Evans, 1947
6. Corymbonotus Maldonado-Capriles, 1977
7. Hyalocerus Maldonado-Capriles, 1977
8. Isolineocerus Freytag, 2008
9. Jamacerus Freytag, 1969
10. Luteobalmus Maldonado-Capriles, 1977
11. Maynacerus Lozada, 1998
12. Nannicerus Maldonado-Capriles, 1977
13. Optocerus Freytag, 1969
14. Parachunroides Maldonado-Capriles, 1977
15. Pseudoidioscopus Maldonado-Capriles, 1977
16. Rotundicerus Maldonado-Capriles, 1977
17. Tomopennis Maldonado-Capriles, 1984

Chileanoscopini

1. Chileanoscopus Freytag & Morrison, 1969
2. Wiloatma Webb, 1983

=== Eurymelini ===
1. Aloeurymela Evans, 1965
2. Dremuela Evans, 1966
3. Eurymela Le Peletier & Audinet-Serville, 1828
4. Eurymelessa Evans, 1933
5. Eurymelita Evans, 1933
6. Eurymeloides Ashmead, 1889
7. Eurymelops Kirkaldy, 1906
8. Eurypella Evans, 1966
9. Pauripo Evans, 1934
10. Pauroeurymela Evans, 1933
11. Platyeurymela Evans, 1933
12. Ipoina Evans, 1933
13. Pogonoscopina China, 1926

Idiocerini

2 subtribes including:

- Amritodina Zhang, 2006: Amritodus Anufriev, 1970
- Idiocerina: Idiocerus Lewis, 1834

Idioceroidini Xue, Dietrich & Zhang, 2020

1. Idioceroides Matsumura, 1912

Kopamerrini Xue, Dietrich & Zhang, 2020

1. Kopamerra Webb, 1983
2. Rotifunkia China, 1926

Macropsini

- Oncopsis Burmeister, 1838
- Pediopsoides Matsumura, 1912

=== Megipocerini ===
Authority: Isaev, 1988; Africa, Asia to Australia

1. Angusticella Maldonado-Capriles, 1972
2. Brachylorus Maldonado-Capriles, 1972
3. Busonia Distant, 1908
4. Candulifera Webb, 1983
5. Ceylonoscopus Viraktamath, 2007
6. Chunra Distant, 1908
7. Dhongariva Webb, 1983
8. Dolichopscerus Maldonado-Capriles, 1985
9. Eutandra Webb, 1983
10. Gressittocerus Maldonado-Capriles, 1985
11. Hensleyella Webb, 1983
12. Hydabricta Webb, 1983
13. Ipocerus Baker, 1915
14. Iposcopus Baker, 1915
15. Kuchingella Wei & Webb, 2010
16. Lankacerus Viraktamath, 2007
17. Maldonadora Webb, 1983
18. Megipocerus Zakhvatkin, 1945
19. Muinocerus Ghauri, 1985
20. Namiocerus Ghauri, 1985
21. Neoscopus Viraktamath, 2007
22. Philippogalla Xue, McKamey & Zhang, 2017
23. Philipposcopus Maldonado-Capriles, 1972
24. Serridiocerus Xue, McKamey & Zhang, 2017

Nesocerini Xue, Dietrich & Zhang, 2020

1. Nesocerus Freytag & Knight, 1966

Incertae sedis

1. Adiaerotoma Spinola, 1850
2. Idiocerella Evans, 1941
3. Idionannus Linnavuori, 1956
4. Meroleucocerus Maldonado-Capriles, 1972
5. Metapocirtus Costa, 1834
6. Strongylomma Spinola, 1850
