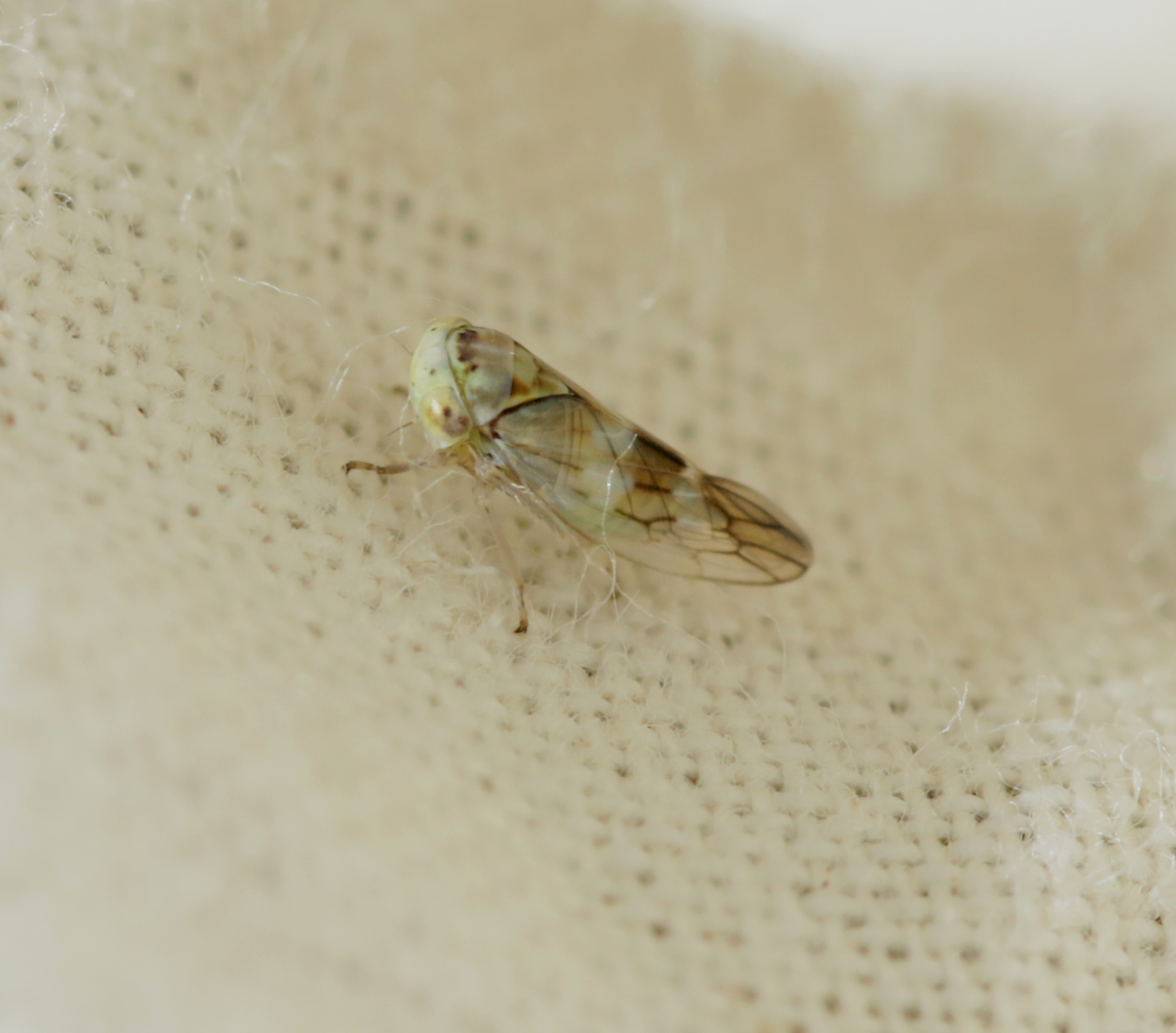
- Tremulicerus is a genus of true bugs. In this photo the Tremulicerus distinguendus species is shown.

Scientific classification
- Kingdom: Animalia
- Phylum: Arthropoda
- Clade: Pancrustacea
- Class: Insecta
- Order: Hemiptera
- Suborder: Auchenorrhyncha
- Family: Cicadellidae
- Tribe: Idiocerini
- Genus: Tremulicerus; Dlabola, 1974

= Tremulicerus =

Genus of true bugs

Tremulicerus is a genus of true bugs belonging to the family Cicadellidae.

The species of this genus are found in Europe, Northern America and New Zealand.

== Species ==
BioLib includes:

1. Tremulicerus dimidiatus (Ribaut, 1952)
2. Tremulicerus distinguendus (Kirschbaum, 1868)
3. Tremulicerus fasciatus Fieber, 1868
4. Tremulicerus fulgidus (Fabricius, 1775)
5. Tremulicerus tremulae (Estlund, 1796)
6. Tremulicerus vitreus (Fabricius, 1803)
