= Barolineocerus spinosus =

Scientific classification
- Kingdom: Animalia
- Phylum: Arthropoda
- Clade: Pancrustacea
- Class: Insecta
- Order: Hemiptera
- Suborder: Auchenorrhyncha
- Family: Cicadellidae
- Genus: Barolineocerus
- Species: B. spinosus

Binomial name
- Barolineocerus spinosus Freytag, 2008

Species of true bug

Barolineocerus spinosus is a species of leafhopper native to the Colombian Amazon. The length is 4.5 millimetres (0.18 in). It is named for the unusual inner spine on the male subgenital plate. It is distinguished from other species in the genus by the subgenital plate. Only the male of the species has been described as of 2008.
