= Barolineocerus bispinus =

Scientific classification
- Domain: Eukaryota
- Kingdom: Animalia
- Phylum: Arthropoda
- Class: Insecta
- Order: Hemiptera
- Suborder: Auchenorrhyncha
- Family: Cicadellidae
- Genus: Barolineocerus
- Species: B. bispinus

Binomial name
- Barolineocerus bispinus Freytag, 2008

Species of true bug

Barolineocerus bispinus is a species of leafhopper native to French Guiana. It is the holotype for the genus Barolineocerus. The length is 4.4–4.6 millimetres (0.17–0.18 in). It is named for the pair of spines on the male anal tube. It is distinguished from other species in the genus on the basis of the spines on the male anal tube and the small spines on the reproductive organ.
