= Barolineocerus chiasmus =

Scientific classification
- Kingdom: Animalia
- Phylum: Arthropoda
- Clade: Pancrustacea
- Class: Insecta
- Order: Hemiptera
- Suborder: Auchenorrhyncha
- Family: Cicadellidae
- Genus: Barolineocerus
- Species: B. chiasmus

Binomial name
- Barolineocerus chiasmus Freytag, 2008

Species of true bug

Barolineocerus chiasmus is a species of leafhopper native to French Guiana. The length is 4.0–4.3 millimetres (0.16–0.17 in). It is named for the thin, sword-like protrusion on the last segment of the abdomen on the male. It is distinguished from other species in the genus on the basis of the aforementioned protrusion.
