= Barolineocerus furcatus =

Scientific classification
- Kingdom: Animalia
- Phylum: Arthropoda
- Clade: Pancrustacea
- Class: Insecta
- Order: Hemiptera
- Suborder: Auchenorrhyncha
- Family: Cicadellidae
- Genus: Barolineocerus
- Species: B. furcatus

Binomial name
- Barolineocerus furcatus Freytag, 2008

Species of true bug

Barolineocerus furcatus is a species of leafhopper native to Colombia and Brazil. The length is 5.0–5.1 millimetres (0.20–0.20 in). It is named for the unusual inner protrusion on the last segment of the abdomen on the male which is bifurcated at the apex. It is distinguished from other species in the genus on the basis of the bifurcated abdomen.
