= Barolineocerus apiculus =

Scientific classification
- Domain: Eukaryota
- Kingdom: Animalia
- Phylum: Arthropoda
- Class: Insecta
- Order: Hemiptera
- Suborder: Auchenorrhyncha
- Family: Cicadellidae
- Genus: Barolineocerus
- Species: B. apiculus

Binomial name
- Barolineocerus apiculus Freytag, 2008

Species of true bug

Barolineocerus apiculus is a species of leafhopper native to French Guiana. The length is 4.4–5 millimetres (0.17–0.20 in). It is named for the unusual apex of the male subgenital plate. It is distinguished from other species in the genus by the unusual male subgenital plate, the bold projections from the anal tube, and the thickened reproductive organ.
