= Barolineocerus elongatus =

Scientific classification
- Kingdom: Animalia
- Phylum: Arthropoda
- Clade: Pancrustacea
- Class: Insecta
- Order: Hemiptera
- Suborder: Auchenorrhyncha
- Family: Cicadellidae
- Genus: Barolineocerus
- Species: B. elongatus

Binomial name
- Barolineocerus elongatus Freytag, 2008

Species of true bug

Barolineocerus elongatus is a species of leafhopper native to Colombia. The length is 4.9–5.0 millimetres (0.19–0.20 in). It is named for the very long male subgenital plates. It is distinguished from other species in the genus by the shortened protrusions of the male anal tube, and the prominent ventral spine on the reproductive organ.
