= Barolineocerus acius =

Scientific classification
- Domain: Eukaryota
- Kingdom: Animalia
- Phylum: Arthropoda
- Class: Insecta
- Order: Hemiptera
- Suborder: Auchenorrhyncha
- Family: Cicadellidae
- Genus: Barolineocerus
- Species: B. acius

Binomial name
- Barolineocerus acius Freytag, 2008

Species of true bug

Barolineocerus acius is a species of leafhopper native to Peru. It is named for the barb-shaped apex of the reproductive organs. It is distinguished from species in the genus by the sharply pointed male subgenital plate.
