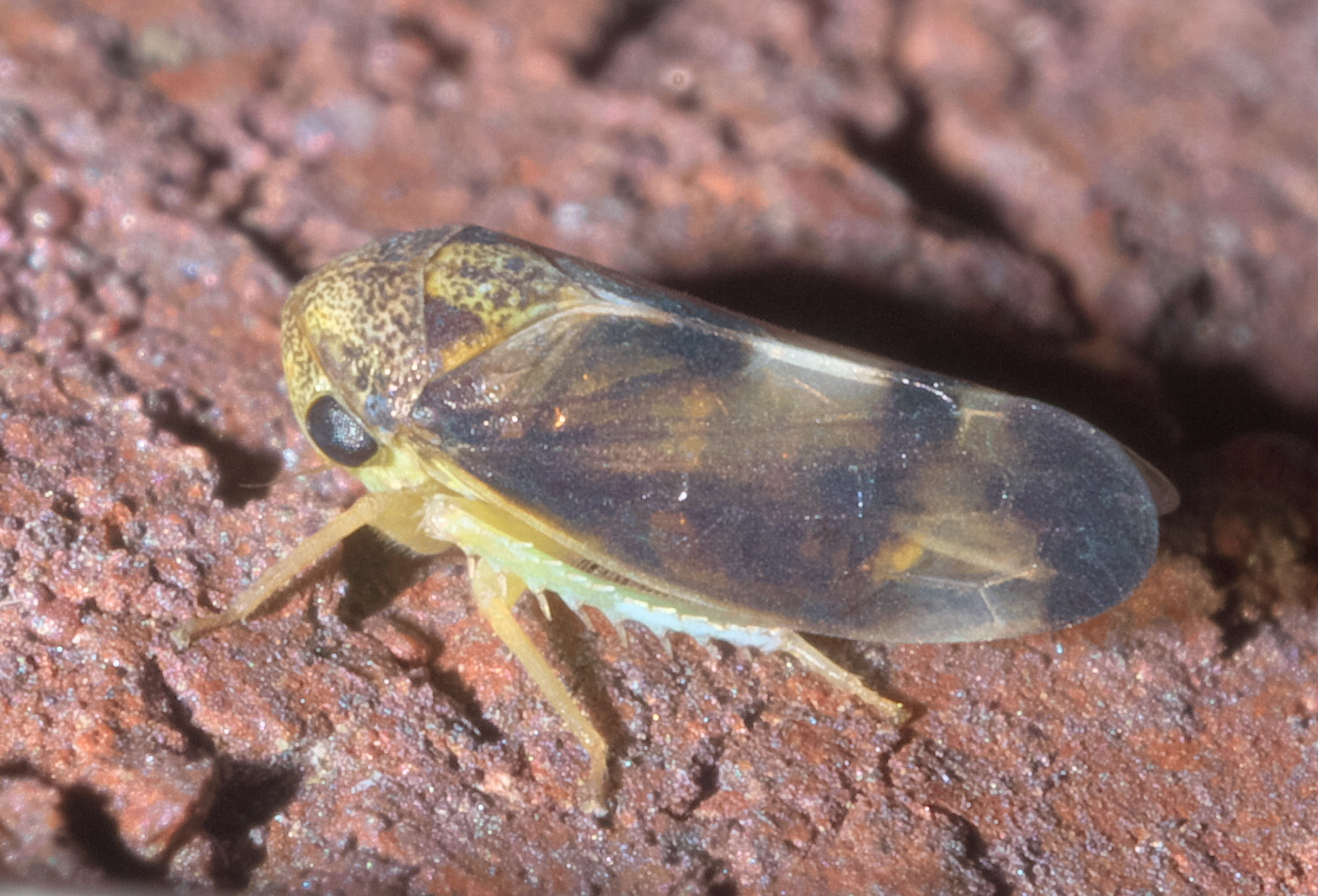

Scientific classification
- Domain: Eukaryota
- Kingdom: Animalia
- Phylum: Arthropoda
- Class: Insecta
- Order: Hemiptera
- Suborder: Auchenorrhyncha
- Family: Cicadellidae
- Genus: Pediopsoides
- Species: P. distinctus

Binomial name
- Pediopsoides distinctus Van Duzee, 1890

= Pediopsoides distinctus =

Species of true bug

Pediopsoides distinctus is a species of leafhopper in the family Cicadellidae.
