= Nesocerus =

Scientific classification
- Domain: Eukaryota
- Kingdom: Animalia
- Phylum: Arthropoda
- Class: Insecta
- Order: Hemiptera
- Suborder: Auchenorrhyncha
- Family: Cicadellidae
- Subfamily: Eurymelinae
- Tribe: Nesocerini; Xue, Dietrich & Zhang, 2020
- Genus: Nesocerus; Freytag & Knight, 1966

Genus of true bugs

Nesocerus is a genus of leafhoppers belonging to the family Cicadellidae from the Malagasy region. This genus counts at present 35 recognized species. As a large proportion of the Nesocerus species are known only from a few or single specimens.

A recent study revealed that the endemic genus Nesocerus is much more speciose that was previously suspected. The known fauna has increased from eight to 37 species. More species undoubtedly await discovery with more intense sampling in Madagascar. This study is the first to use phylogenetic methods in examining relationships within a genus of idiocerine leafhoppers. Additional knowledge of ecology and life history of these species may help to elucidate the factors that yielded the high degree of diversity in this group. This diverse endemic genus may be useful as a model organism for understanding diversification processes in Madagascar.
