= Barolineocerus declivus =

Scientific classification
- Domain: Eukaryota
- Kingdom: Animalia
- Phylum: Arthropoda
- Class: Insecta
- Order: Hemiptera
- Suborder: Auchenorrhyncha
- Family: Cicadellidae
- Genus: Barolineocerus
- Species: B. declivus

Binomial name
- Barolineocerus declivus Freytag, 2008

Species of true bug

Barolineocerus declivus is a species of leafhopper native to French Guiana. The length is 4.4–5.0 millimetres (0.17–0.20 in). It is named for the protrusions from the male anal tube being bent downward. It is distinguished from other species in the genus by the protrusions of the male anal tube and the plain reproductive organ.
