= Barolineocerus ornatus =

Scientific classification
- Domain: Eukaryota
- Kingdom: Animalia
- Phylum: Arthropoda
- Class: Insecta
- Order: Hemiptera
- Suborder: Auchenorrhyncha
- Family: Cicadellidae
- Genus: Barolineocerus
- Species: B. ornatus

Binomial name
- Barolineocerus ornatus Freytag, 2008

Species of true bug

Barolineocerus ornatus is a species of leafhopper native to French Guiana. The length is 4.0–4.3 millimetres (0.16–0.17 in). It is named for the unusual long process on the last segment of the abdomen of the male, which is bifurcated at the apex. It is distinguished from other species in the genus on the basis of the protrusion on the abdomen.
