= Amritodus =

Scientific classification
- Kingdom: Animalia
- Phylum: Arthropoda
- Clade: Pancrustacea
- Class: Insecta
- Order: Hemiptera
- Suborder: Auchenorrhyncha
- Family: Cicadellidae
- Subfamily: Eurymelinae
- Tribe: Idiocerini
- Genus: Amritodus; Anufriev, 1970

Type species
- Idiocerus atkinsoni Lethierry, 1889

Genus of insects

Amritodus is a genus of leafhoppers in the subfamily Idiocerinae. The genus is limited to the Indian subcontinent, including Sri Lanka; many species feed on plants belonging to the family Anacardiaceae. The genus included a number of species based on morphological characters but a molecular phylogenetic study in 2020 led to the revision of the genus. The new study found two clades within the genus leading to it being split into a new genus Paramritodus.

The genus Paramritodus includes what were previously called Amritodus flavocapitatus, A. pistacious and A. podocarpus having the shared characters of a finely rugose crown, shagreen pronotal surface, vein characters of the forewing with r-m1 crossvein and no m-cu1 vein, and a hind leg with three platellae. The other characters are in the male genitalia.

== Description ==
The stricter new genus Amritodus which includes the clade of the type species has a crown with a pair of black spots. The face is yellow or brown. The pronotum has a pair of black markings. The ocelli are closer to the eyes than to each other. The forewing venation includes a m-cu1 cross-vein but without r-m1 and m-cu2 cross-veins. The hind femur has 2+1 spines at the apex. The hind tibia has 18-20 setae on one row and 6 on the other. The genus is close to Idioscopus but is differentiated by the male genitalia.

== Species ==
The genus includes:

- Amritodus atkinsoni (Lethierry, 1889)
- Amritodus brevis Viraktamath, 1997
- Amritodus brevistylus Viraktamath, 1976
- Amritodus saeedi Ahmed, Naheed & Ahmed, 1980
