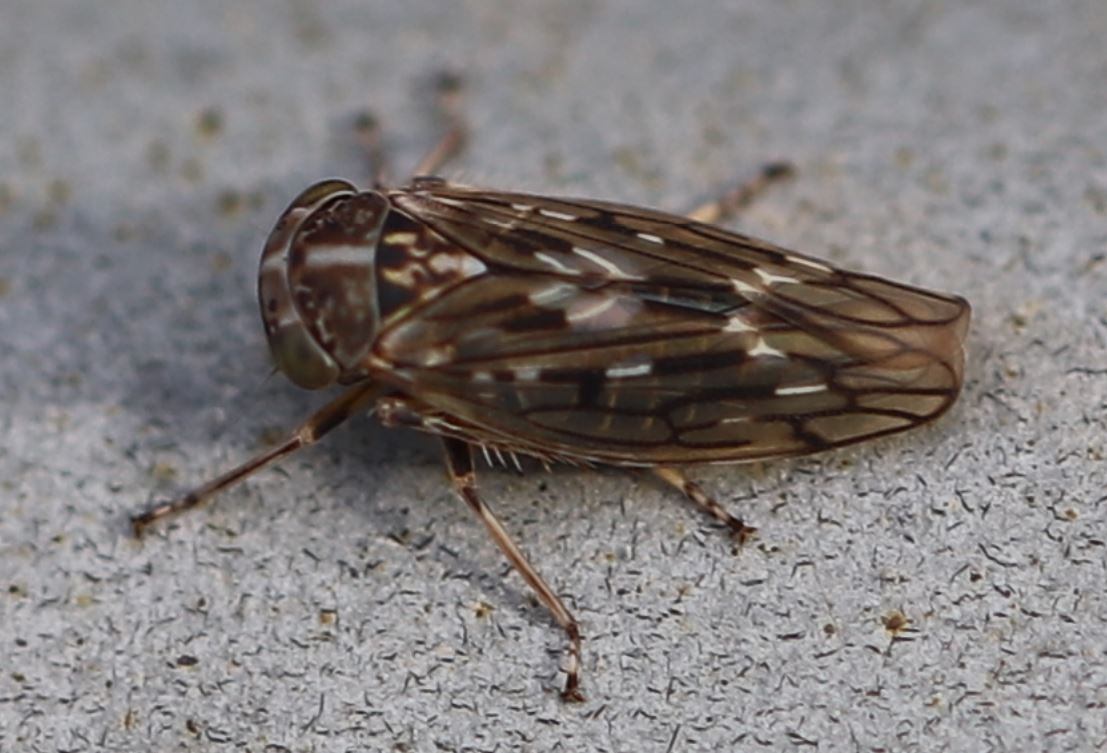

Scientific classification
- Kingdom: Animalia
- Phylum: Arthropoda
- Clade: Pancrustacea
- Class: Insecta
- Order: Hemiptera
- Suborder: Auchenorrhyncha
- Family: Cicadellidae
- Genus: Stenidiocerus
- Species: S. poecilus

Binomial name
- Stenidiocerus poecilus (Herrich-Schäffer, 1835)

Synonyms
- List: Bythoscopus falcifer Boheman, 1845; Bythoscopus falciger Boheman, 1845; Bythoscopus poecilus Herrich-Schäffer, 1835; Idiocerus discolor Flor, 1861; Idiocerus falciger (Boheman, 1845); Idiocerus paecilus (Herrich-Schäffer, 1835); Idiocerus poecilus (Herrich-Schäffer, 1835); Idiocerus venustus Scott, 1874; Tremulicerus poecilus (Herrich-Schäffer, 1835); Metidiocerus poecilus (Herrich-Schäffer, 1835)

= Stenidiocerus poecilus =

Genus of true bugs

Stenidiocerus poecilus is a species of true bug in the family Cicadellidae. It is found in Europe and North America.
