= Sahlbergotettix =

Scientific classification
- Kingdom: Animalia
- Phylum: Arthropoda
- Clade: Pancrustacea
- Class: Insecta
- Order: Hemiptera
- Suborder: Auchenorrhyncha
- Family: Cicadellidae
- Tribe: Idiocerini
- Genus: Sahlbergotettix; Zachvatkin, 1953

Genus of true bugs

Sahlbergotettix is a genus of true bugs belonging to the family Cicadellidae.

The species of this genus are found in Europe.

Species:

- Sahlbergotettix salicicola (Flor, 1861)
