= Barolineocerus =

Scientific classification
- Kingdom: Animalia
- Phylum: Arthropoda
- Clade: Pancrustacea
- Class: Insecta
- Order: Hemiptera
- Suborder: Auchenorrhyncha
- Family: Cicadellidae
- Tribe: Chiasmodolini
- Genus: Barolineocerus; Freytag, 2008

Genus of true bugs

Barolineocerus is a genus of South American leafhoppers in the tribe Chiasmodolini.

== Description ==
Barolineocerus adults are about 4–6 millimetres (0.16–0.24 in) long. The head is yellow to white with brown margins on the face. The pronotum is yellowish white in the middle bordered with white and a thick black line on the posterior margin with the remainder of the pronotum being brown. The wings are yellow to yellow green with white borders and a thick black line on the posterior border.

== Species ==
As of October 2026, the World Auchenorrhyncha Database includes:

1. Barolineocerus acius Freytag, 2008
2. Barolineocerus apiculus Freytag, 2008
3. Barolineocerus bispinus Freytag, 2008 - type species (synonym Barolineocerus declivus)
4. Barolineocerus chiasmus Freytag, 2008
5. Barolineocerus chicomendesi Praciano, Dietrich & Takiya, 2025
6. Barolineocerus dercyae Praciano, Dietrich & Takiya, 2025
7. Barolineocerus digitatus Praciano, Dietrich & Takiya, 2025
8. Barolineocerus elongatus Freytag, 2008
9. Barolineocerus furcatus Freytag, 2008
10. Barolineocerus ornatus Freytag, 2008
11. Barolineocerus spinosus Freytag, 2008
