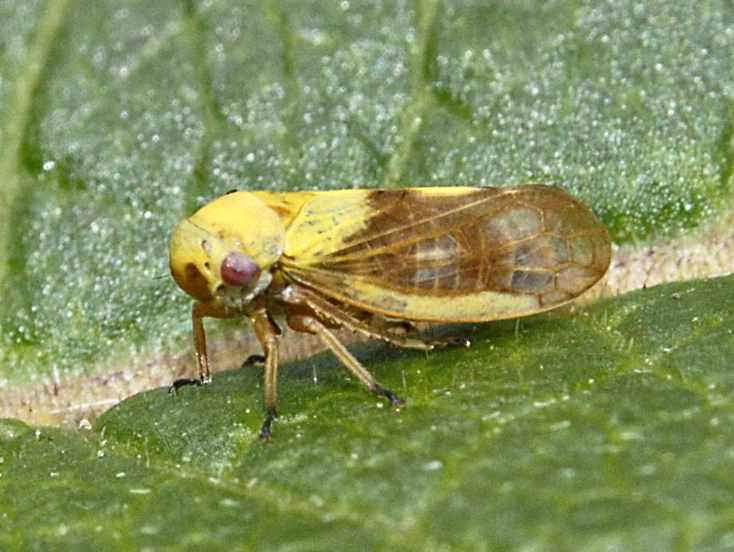
- Oncopsis flavicollis

Scientific classification
- Kingdom: Animalia
- Phylum: Arthropoda
- Class: Insecta
- Order: Hemiptera
- Suborder: Auchenorrhyncha
- Family: Cicadellidae
- Subfamily: Eurymelinae
- Tribe: Macropsini
- Genus: Oncopsis; Burmeister, 1838

= Oncopsis =

Genus of true bugs

Oncopsis is a genus of leafhoppers belonging to the family Cicadellidae subfamily Eurymelinae. In this genus the striations on the pronotum are parallel to the hind margin.

== Species ==
- Oncopsis abietis
- Oncopsis albicollis
- Oncopsis alni
- Oncopsis aomians
- Oncopsis appendiculata
- Oncopsis arizona
- Oncopsis aurantiaca
- Oncopsis aureostria
- Oncopsis avellanae
- Oncopsis baileyi
- Oncopsis californicus
- Oncopsis caliginosa
- Oncopsis carpini
- Oncopsis cinctifrons
- Oncopsis citra
- Oncopsis citrella
- Oncopsis cognata
- Oncopsis coloradensis
- Oncopsis concurrens
- Oncopsis crispae
- Oncopsis deluda
- Oncopsis dentata
- Oncopsis despectus
- Oncopsis discrepans
- Oncopsis dorsalis
- Oncopsis enopsis
- Oncopsis fitchi
- Oncopsis flavicollis
- Oncopsis flavovirens
- Oncopsis fumosa
- Oncopsis furvus
- Oncopsis fuscus
- Oncopsis incidens
- Oncopsis infumata
- Oncopsis insignifica
- Oncopsis interior
- Oncopsis ivanovae
- Oncopsis juglans
- Oncopsis juno
- Oncopsis kogotensis
- Oncopsis kuluensis
- Oncopsis lata
- Oncopsis mali
- Oncopsis marilynae
- Oncopsis melichari
- Oncopsis mica
- Oncopsis minor
- Oncopsis monticola
- Oncopsis nepalensis
- Oncopsis nigrinasi
- Oncopsis nigritus
- Oncopsis nitobei
- Oncopsis obstructa
- Oncopsis ochotensis
- Oncopsis omogonis
- Oncopsis plagiata
- Oncopsis planiscuta
- Oncopsis prolixa
- Oncopsis punctatissima
- Oncopsis quebecensis
- Oncopsis sardescens
- Oncopsis sepulcralis
- Oncopsis sobrius
- Oncopsis speciosa
- Oncopsis subangulata
- Oncopsis subangulatus
- Oncopsis sulphurea
- Oncopsis tadzhicus
- Oncopsis tangenta
- Oncopsis tenuifoliae
- Oncopsis testacea
- Oncopsis tortosa
- Oncopsis towadensis
- Oncopsis trimaculata
- Oncopsis tristis
- Oncopsis truncatus
- Oncopsis wagneri
- Oncopsis variabilis
- Oncopsis vartyi
