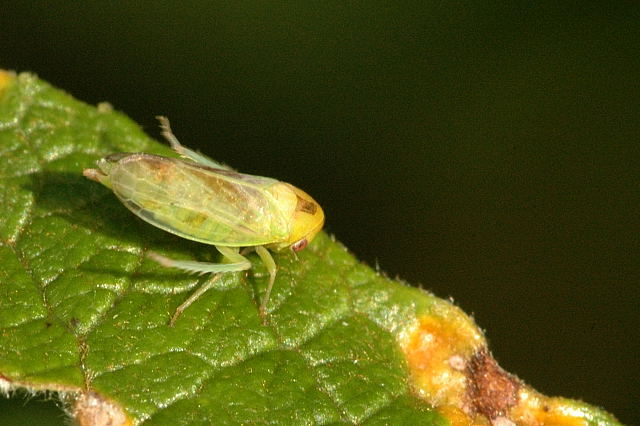
- Macropsis.prasina

Scientific classification
- Domain: Eukaryota
- Kingdom: Animalia
- Phylum: Arthropoda
- Class: Insecta
- Order: Hemiptera
- Suborder: Auchenorrhyncha
- Family: Cicadellidae
- Genus: Macropsis; Lewis, 1834

= Macropsis =

Genus of true bugs

Macropsis is a genus of true bugs belonging to the family Cicadellidae. The genus was first described in 1834 by R.H. Lewis.

Species:

- Macropsis acrotirica
- Macropsis albae
