= Busonia =

Scientific classification
- Kingdom: Animalia
- Phylum: Arthropoda
- Clade: Pancrustacea
- Class: Insecta
- Order: Hemiptera
- Suborder: Auchenorrhyncha
- Family: Cicadellidae
- Subfamily: Eurymelinae
- Tribe: Megipocerini
- Genus: Busonia; Distant, 1908

Genus of true bugs

External image
- Images at iNaturalist

Busonia is a genus of Asian leafhoppers in the subfamily Eurymelinae and tribe Megipocerini; it was erected by William Lucas Distant in 1908. Species have been recorded from China, Nepal, Indochina, Malesia, through to New Guinea.

== Species ==
The World Auchenorrhyncha Database includes:

1. Busonia albilateralis Maldonado-Capriles, 1977
2. Busonia amentata Distant, 1908 - type species (by original designation)
3. Busonia apicalis Maldonado-Capriles, 1977
4. Busonia curvata Xue & Zhang, 2015
5. Busonia distanti Viraktamath & Yeshwanth, 2024
6. Busonia dorsalis Maldonado-Capriles, 1977
7. Busonia fusca Xue & Zhang, 2015
8. Busonia insularis Schmidt, 1926
9. Busonia javanensis Maldonado-Capriles, 1977
10. Busonia lactata Xue & Zhang, 2015
11. Busonia manipurensis Viraktamath & Yeshwanth, 2024
12. Busonia micrata Xue & Zhang, 2015
13. Busonia scutellaris Baker, 1915
14. Busonia serrata Xue & Zhang, 2015
15. Busonia thai Maldonado-Capriles, 1977
