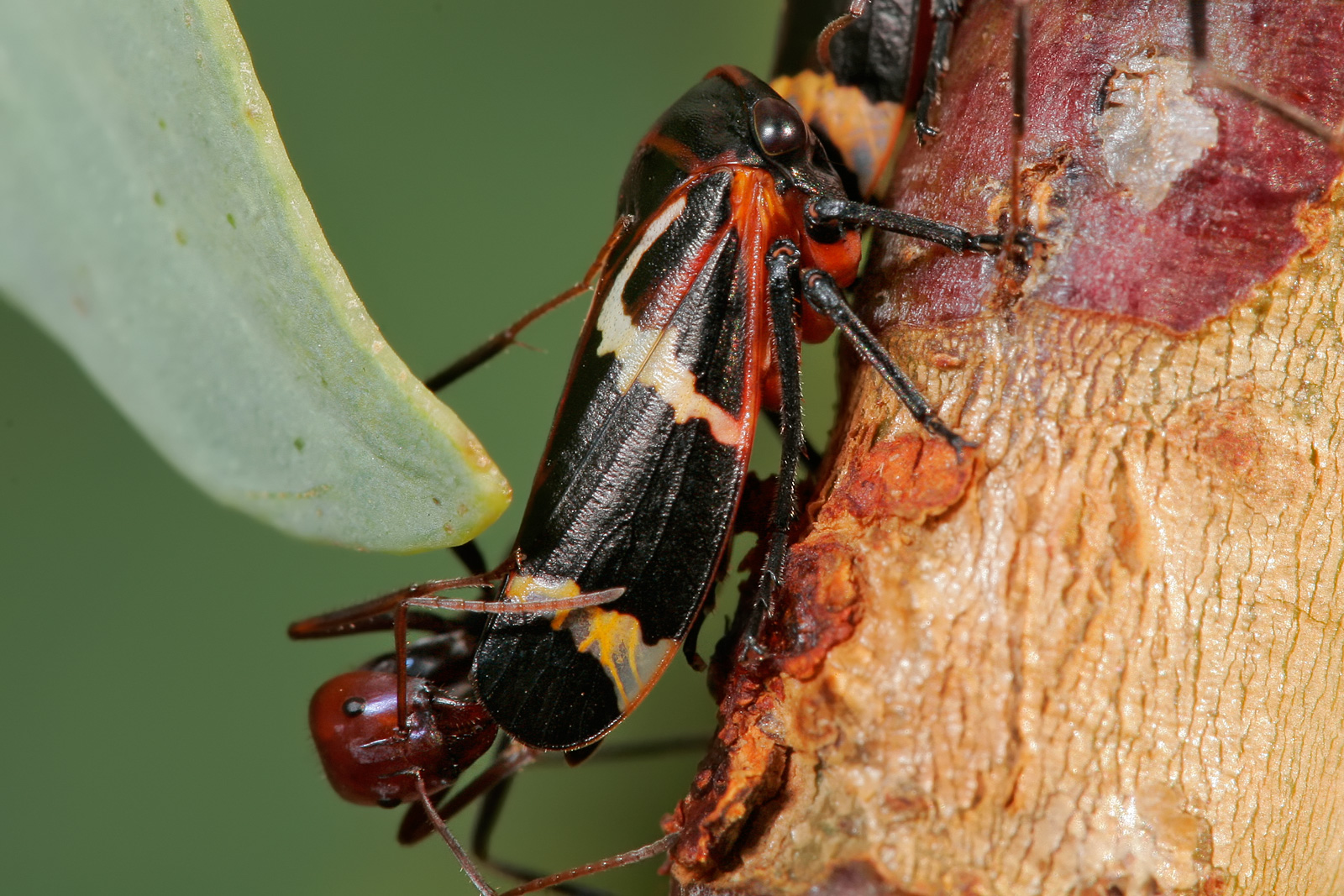
- Adult demonstrating a symbiotic relationship with meat ants

Scientific classification
- Kingdom: Animalia
- Phylum: Arthropoda
- Clade: Pancrustacea
- Class: Insecta
- Order: Hemiptera
- Suborder: Auchenorrhyncha
- Family: Cicadellidae
- Genus: Eurymeloides
- Species: E. bicincta

Binomial name
- Eurymeloides bicincta Erichson, 1842

= Eurymeloides bicincta =

Species of true bug

Eurymeloides bicincta, commonly known as the two-lined gum-treehopper, is a leafhopper in the family Cicadellidae. It is the type species of the genus Eurymeloides. It is a sap-sucking insect and is found on gum-trees in its native southeastern Australia.

== Description ==
Eurymeloides bicincta grows to a length of about 8 mm (0.3 in). The adult is wedge-shaped and is black with large orange eyes and white lines on its wings. The nymphs are orange.

== Ecology ==
Eurymeloides bicincta is found on Eucalyptus trees where both nymphs and adults have piercing mouthparts and suck the sap. The excess fluid is secreted and is fed upon by ants which are often found associated with the leafhoppers. The ants do not harm the leafhoppers but may drive off potential predators.

Some sand wasps in the tribe Nyssonini prey on this leafhopper, carrying off adults to provision the cells in which the wasps lay their eggs.
