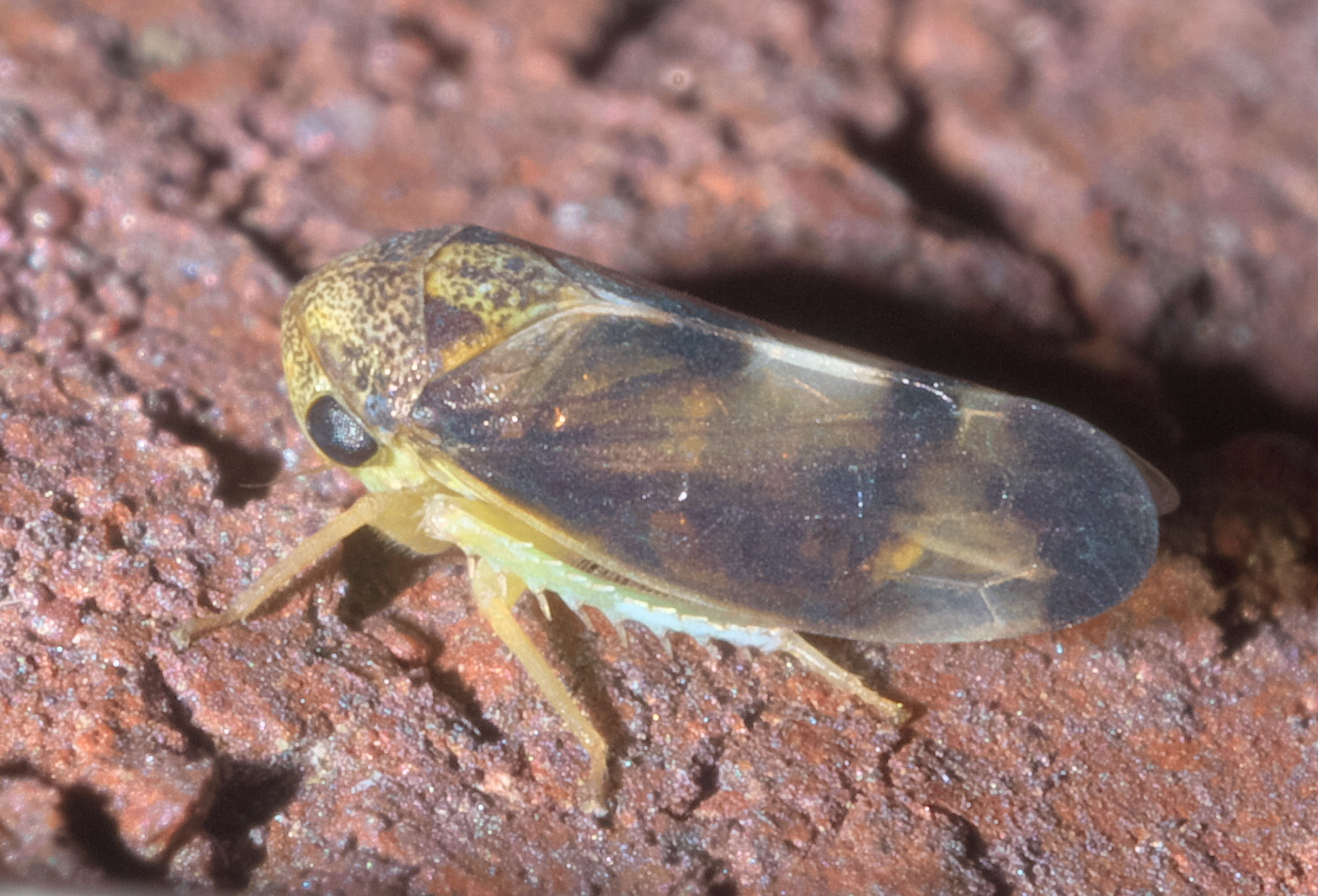
- Pediopsoides distinctus

Scientific classification
- Kingdom: Animalia
- Phylum: Arthropoda
- Clade: Pancrustacea
- Class: Insecta
- Order: Hemiptera
- Suborder: Auchenorrhyncha
- Family: Cicadellidae
- Subfamily: Eurymelinae
- Genus: Pediopsoides; Matsumura, 1912

= Pediopsoides =

Genus of true bugs

Pediopsoides is a genus of leafhoppers in the family Cicadellidae.

== Species ==
There are 31 recognised species place in four subgenera.

Subgenus Pediopsoides (Pediopsoides) Matsumura, 1912

- Pediopsoides ailaoshanensis Li & Dai, 2023
- Pediopsoides albus Li, Dai & Li, 2016
- Pediopsoides amplificatus Li, Dai & Li, 2016
- Pediopsoides anchorides Yang & Zhang, 2013
- Pediopsoides bispinatus Li, Dai & Li, 2012
- Pediopsoides damingshanensis Li, Dai & Li, 2013
- Pediopsoides femoratus Hamilton, 1980
- Pediopsoides flavus Li & Dai, 2023
- Pediopsoides formosanus Matsumura, 1912
- Pediopsoides huangi Li & Dai, 2023
- Pediopsoides jingdongensis Zhang, 2010
- Pediopsoides kodaianus Viraktamath, 1996
- Pediopsoides longiapophysis Li, Dai & Li, 2016
- Pediopsoides maoershanensis Li & Dai, 2023
- Pediopsoides nigrolabium Li, Dai & Li, 2012
- Pediopsoides planmaensis Li & Dai, 2023
- Pediopsoides quadripinosus Li & Dai, 2023
- Pediopsoides satsumensis (Matsumura, 1912)
- Pediopsoides tishetshkini Li, Dai & Li, 2013

Subgenus Pediopsoides (Kiamoncopsis) Linnavuori, 1978

- Pediopsoides medeia Linnavuori, 1978
- Pediopsoides quartaui Linnavuori, 1978
- Pediopsoides serratus Linnavuori, 1978
- Pediopsoides testaceus Linnavuori, 1978

Subgenus Pediopsoides (Pseudonanopsis) Dmitriev, 2020

- Pediopsoides davisi (Knull, 1940)
- Pediopsoides distinctus (Van Duzee, 1890)

Subgenus Pediopsoides (Sispocnis) Anufriev, 1967

- Pediopsoides aomians (Kuoh, 1982)
- Pediopsoides dilatus Dai & Zhang, 2009
- Pediopsoides kogotensis Matsumura, 1912
- Pediopsoides rectus Li, Li & Dai, 2019
- Pediopsoides sharmai Viraktamath 1981
- Pediopsoides triangulus Li, Li & Dai, 2019
