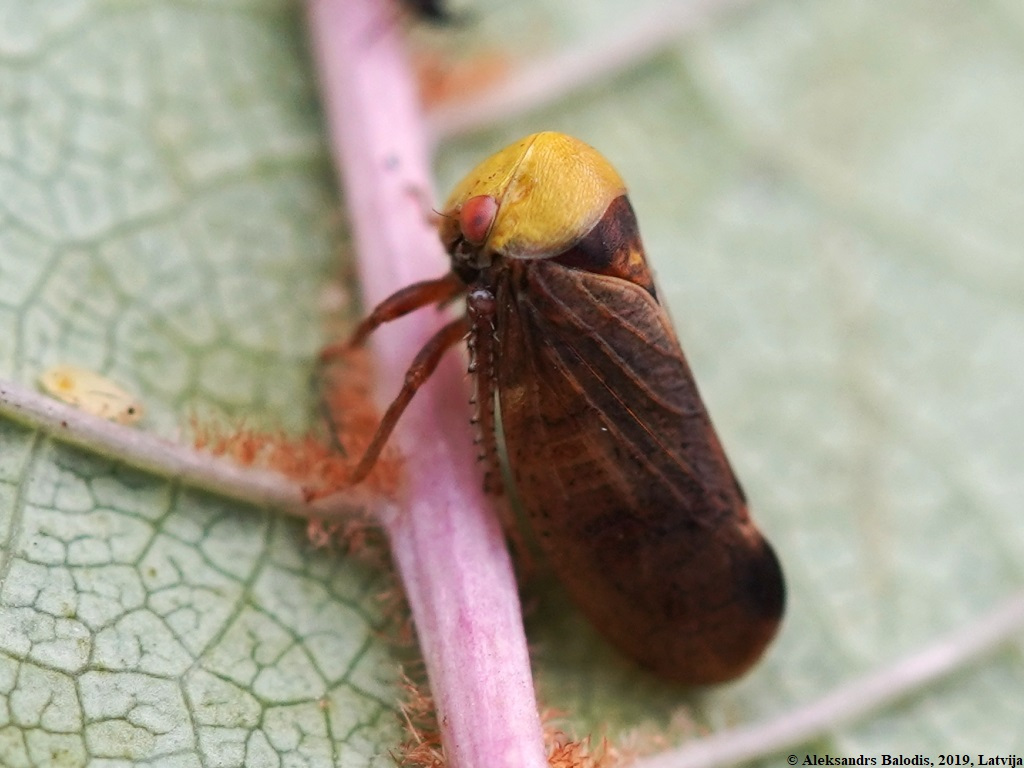

Scientific classification
- Kingdom: Animalia
- Phylum: Arthropoda
- Class: Insecta
- Order: Hemiptera
- Suborder: Auchenorrhyncha
- Family: Cicadellidae
- Genus: Pediopsis; Burmeister, 1838

= Pediopsis =

Genus of true bugs

Pediopsis is a genus of true bugs belonging to the family Cicadellidae.

The genus has almost cosmopolitan distribution.

Species:

- Pediopsis bannaensis
- Pediopsis bicolor
