= Metidiocerus =

Scientific classification
- Kingdom: Animalia
- Phylum: Arthropoda
- Clade: Pancrustacea
- Class: Insecta
- Order: Hemiptera
- Suborder: Auchenorrhyncha
- Family: Cicadellidae
- Tribe: Idiocerini
- Genus: Metidiocerus; Ossiannilsson, 1981

Synonyms
- Stenidiocerus Ossiannilsson, 1981; Stenidiocrus Ossiannilsson, 1981

Genus of true bugs

Metidiocerus is a genus of true bugs belonging to the family Cicadellidae.

The species of this genus are found in Europe.

== Species ==
The following species are recognised in the genus Metidiocerus:

- Metidiocerus ampullipes Isaev, 1988
- Metidiocerus buchtarmensis (Mitjaev, 2014)
- Metidiocerus crassipes (Sahlberg, 1871)
- Metidiocerus dolonicus (Mitjaev, 2014)
- Metidiocerus dzhungaricus (Mitjaev, 2014)
- Metidiocerus elegans (Flor, 1861)
- Metidiocerus impressifrons (Kirschbaum, 1868)
- Metidiocerus nigrolineatus (Kwon, 1985)
- Metidiocerus rutilans (Kirschbaum, 1868)
