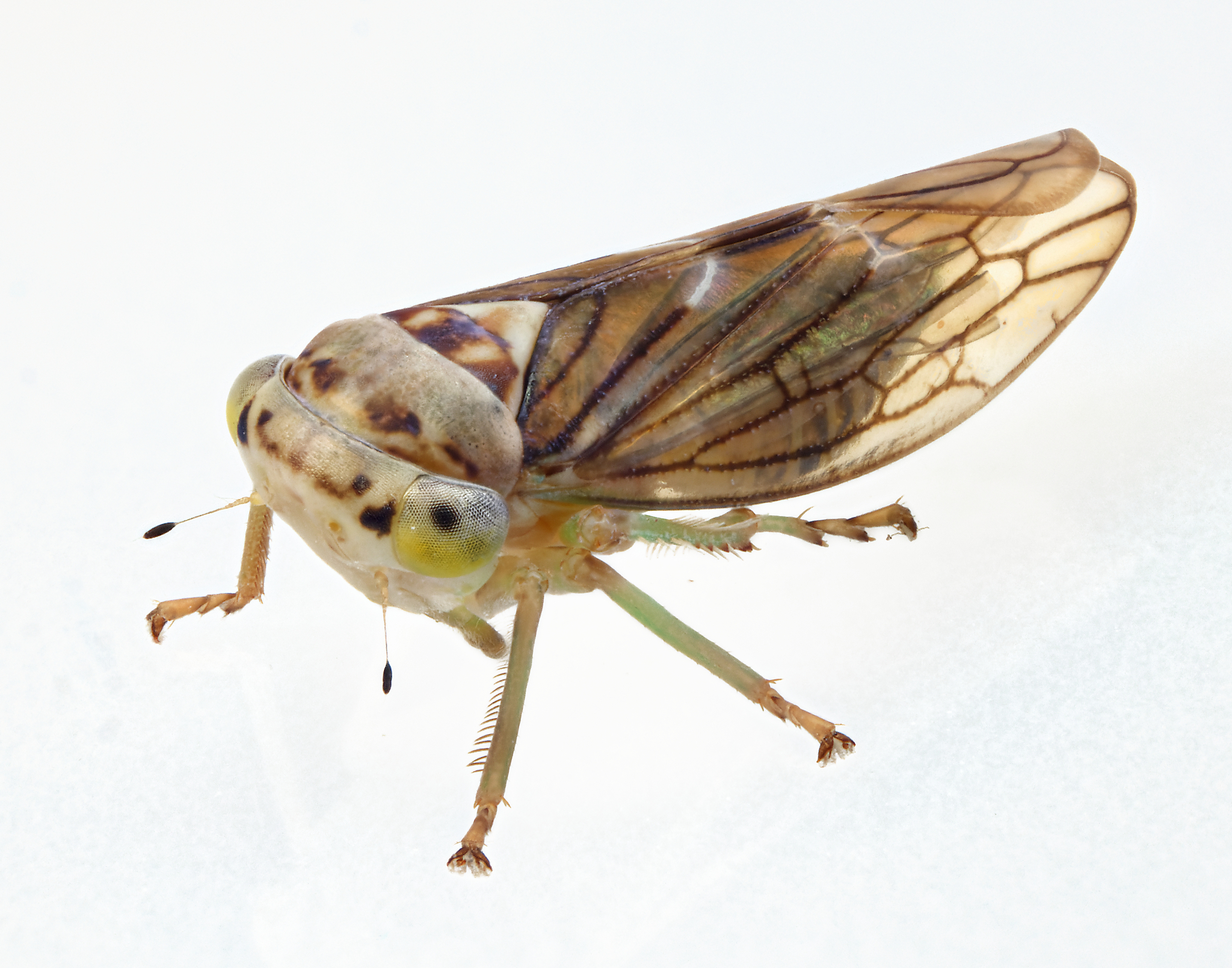
- Populicerus formosus

Scientific classification
- Kingdom: Animalia
- Phylum: Arthropoda
- Class: Insecta
- Order: Hemiptera
- Suborder: Auchenorrhyncha
- Family: Cicadellidae
- Genus: Populicerus; Dlabola, 1974

= Populicerus =

Genus of bugs

Populicerus is a genus of true bugs belonging to the family Cicadellidae.

The species of this genus are found in Europe and North America.

== Species ==
The following species are recognised in the genus Populicerus:

- Populicerus albicans (Kirschbaum, 1868)
- Populicerus albostriatus Cai & Shen, 1998
- Populicerus ambigenus (Dubovsky, 1966)
- Populicerus aureus (Hamilton, 1980)
- Populicerus carolina (Hamilton, 1980)
- Populicerus confusus (Flor, 1861)
- Populicerus duzeei (Provancher, 1889)
- Populicerus formosus (Ball, 1902)
- Populicerus gillettei (Hamilton, 1980)
- Populicerus harimensis (Matsumura, 1912)
- Populicerus inebrius (Hamilton, 1980)
- Populicerus lachrymalis (Fitch, 1851)
- Populicerus laminatus (Flor, 1861)
- Populicerus levis (DeLong & Caldwell, 1937)
- Populicerus lunaris (Ball, 1902)
- Populicerus midas (Hamilton, 1980)
- Populicerus nitidissimus (Herrich-Schäffer, 1835)
- Populicerus obsoletus (Walker, 1851)
- Populicerus orientalis Isaev, 1988
- Populicerus pallidus (Fitch, 1851)
- Populicerus perplexus (Gillette & Baker, 1895)
- Populicerus populi (Linnaeus, 1761)
- Populicerus scharifi Dlabola, 1977
- Populicerus stellaris (DeLong & Caldwell, 1937)
- Populicerus sudzuhensis (Vilbaste, 1968)
- Populicerus suturalis (Fitch, 1851)
- Populicerus unicolor (Hamilton, 1980)
- Populicerus vanduzeei (Hamilton, 1980)
- Populicerus venosus (Hamilton, 1980)
- BOLD:ADT4296 (Populicerus sp.)
