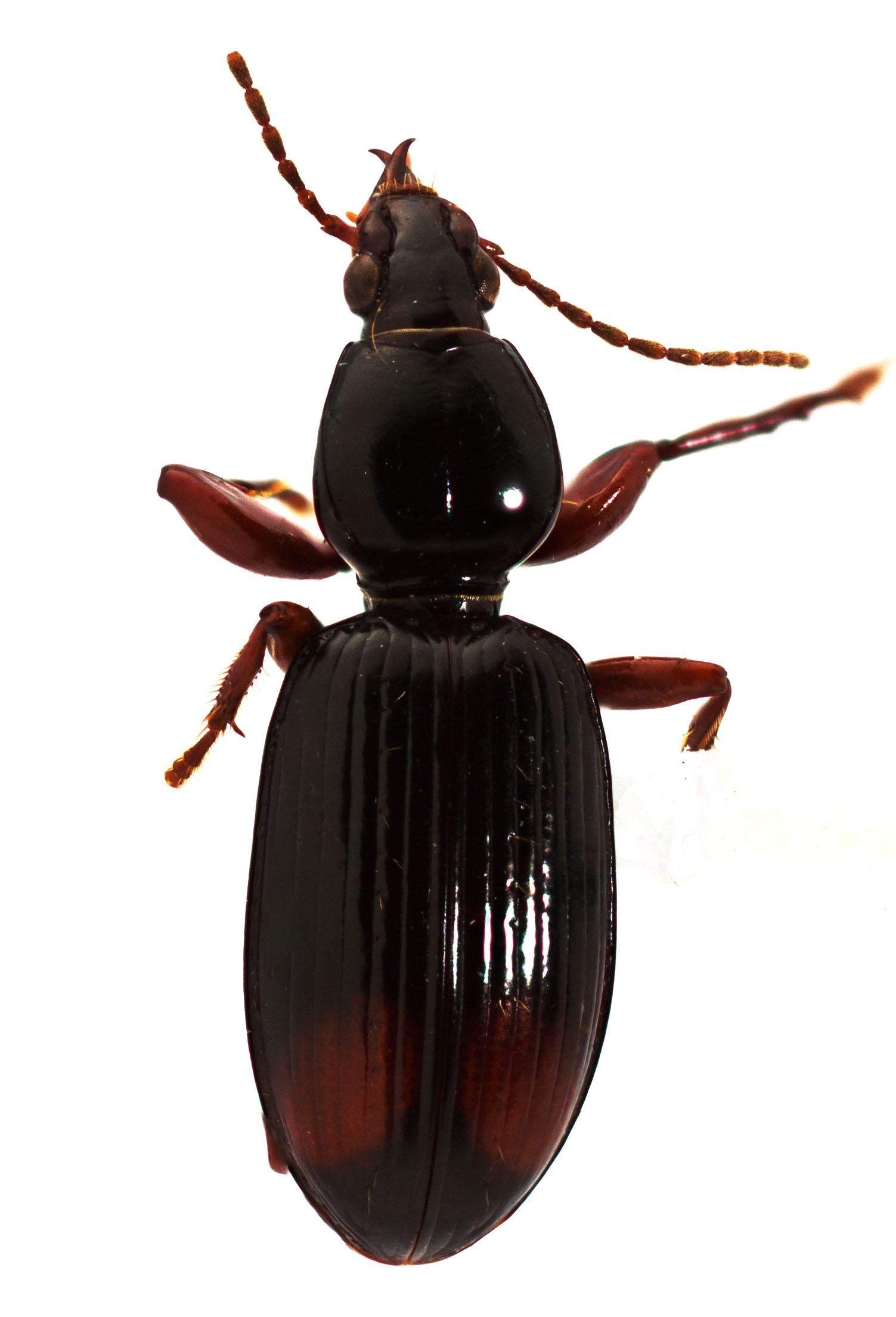
- Ardistomis obliquatus

Scientific classification
- Domain: Eukaryota
- Kingdom: Animalia
- Phylum: Arthropoda
- Class: Insecta
- Order: Coleoptera
- Suborder: Adephaga
- Family: Carabidae
- Subfamily: Scaritinae
- Tribe: Clivinini
- Subtribe: Ardistomina
- Genus: Ardistomis; Putzeys, 1846

= Ardistomis =

Genus of beetles

Ardistomis is a genus of pedunculate ground beetles in the family Carabidae. There are more than 40 described species in Ardistomis, in North, Central, and South America.

== Species ==
These 49 species belong to the genus Ardistomis:

- Ardistomis alticola Darlington, 1936 (Hispaniola)
- Ardistomis annona Putzeys, 1846 (French Guiana)
- Ardistomis arechavaletae Putzeys, 1867 (South America)
- Ardistomis aschnae Makhan, 2010 (Surinam)
- Ardistomis atripennis Putzeys, 1867 (the Lesser Antilles)
- Ardistomis batesi Putzeys, 1867 (South America)
- Ardistomis brevis Putzeys, 1867 (Brazil and Ecuador)
- Ardistomis bulirschi Valdes, 2009 (Ecuador)
- Ardistomis constricta Putzeys, 1846 (Brazil)
- Ardistomis convexa Putzeys, 1867 (Mexico and Central America)
- Ardistomis dostali Valdes, 2009 (Central America)
- Ardistomis drumonti Valdes, 2009 (French Guiana)
- Ardistomis dubia Putzeys, 1846 (Colombia)
- Ardistomis dyschirioides Putzeys, 1846 (Colombia and Panama)
- Ardistomis educta Bates, 1881 (Mexico and Central America)
- Ardistomis elongatula Putzeys, 1867 (Cuba)
- Ardistomis fasciolata Putzeys, 1846 (Brazil)
- Ardistomis ferreirai Balkenohl & Pellegrini & Almeida Zampaulo, 2018 (Brazil)
- Ardistomis franki Nichols, 1988 (the Lesser Antilles)
- Ardistomis guadeloupensis Kult, 1950 (the Lesser Antilles)
- Ardistomis haemorrhoa Putzeys, 1867 (Brazil and Peru)
- Ardistomis hispaniolensis Nichols, 1988 (Hispaniola and the Lesser Antilles)
- Ardistomis leprieurii (Chaudoir, 1843) (South America)
- Ardistomis lindrothi Kult, 1950 (Bolivia and Brazil)
- Ardistomis mannerheimi Putzeys, 1846 (the Caribbean, Mexico, Central America)
- Ardistomis marquardti Kult, 1950 (Brazil)
- Ardistomis minuta Valdes, 2009
- Ardistomis muelleri Kult, 1950 (Mexico)
- Ardistomis nigroclara Darlington, 1939 (Hispaniola)
- Ardistomis nitidipennis Darlington, 1934 (Cuba)
- Ardistomis obliquata Putzeys, 1846 (North America)
- Ardistomis ogloblini Kult, 1950 (Brazil)
- Ardistomis onorei Valdes, 2009
- Ardistomis ovata Putzeys, 1846 (Colombia)
- Ardistomis oxygnatha (Chaudoir, 1843) (Brazil and French Guiana)
- Ardistomis posticalis Putzeys, 1867 (Brazil)
- Ardistomis profundestriata Putzeys, 1867 (Brazil)
- Ardistomis quadripunctata Kult, 1950 (Brazil)
- Ardistomis quixotei Valdes, 2007
- Ardistomis ramsdeni Darlington, 1937 (Cuba)
- Ardistomis rotundipennis Putzeys, 1867
- Ardistomis rufoclara Darlington, 1939 (Hispaniola)
- Ardistomis samyni Valdes, 2009
- Ardistomis schaumii LeConte, 1857 (Central and North America)
- Ardistomis seriepunctata (Brullé, 1843) (Brazil, Colombia, and Panama)
- Ardistomis tropicalis Putzeys, 1846 (French Guiana)
- Ardistomis unicolor Putzeys, 1846 (French Guiana)
- Ardistomis venustula Putzeys, 1867 (Brazil and Surinam)
- Ardistomis vergelae Valdes, 2009
