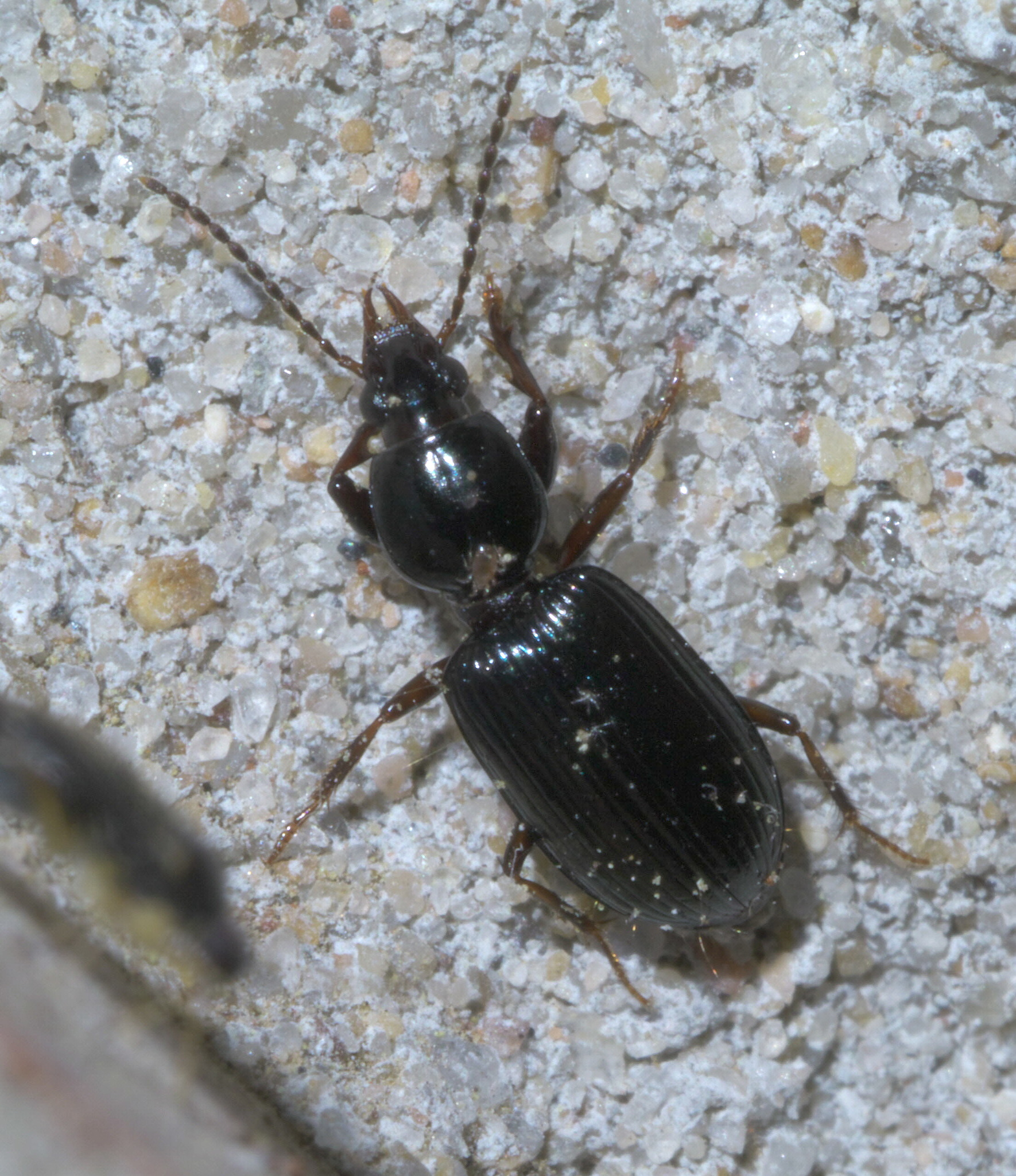
- Ardistomis schaumii, Oklahoma

Scientific classification
- Domain: Eukaryota
- Kingdom: Animalia
- Phylum: Arthropoda
- Class: Insecta
- Order: Coleoptera
- Suborder: Adephaga
- Family: Carabidae
- Genus: Ardistomis
- Species: A. schaumii

Binomial name
- Ardistomis schaumii LeConte, 1857

= Ardistomis schaumii =

Species of beetle

Ardistomis schaumii is a species of ground beetle in the family Carabidae. It is found in Central America and North America.
