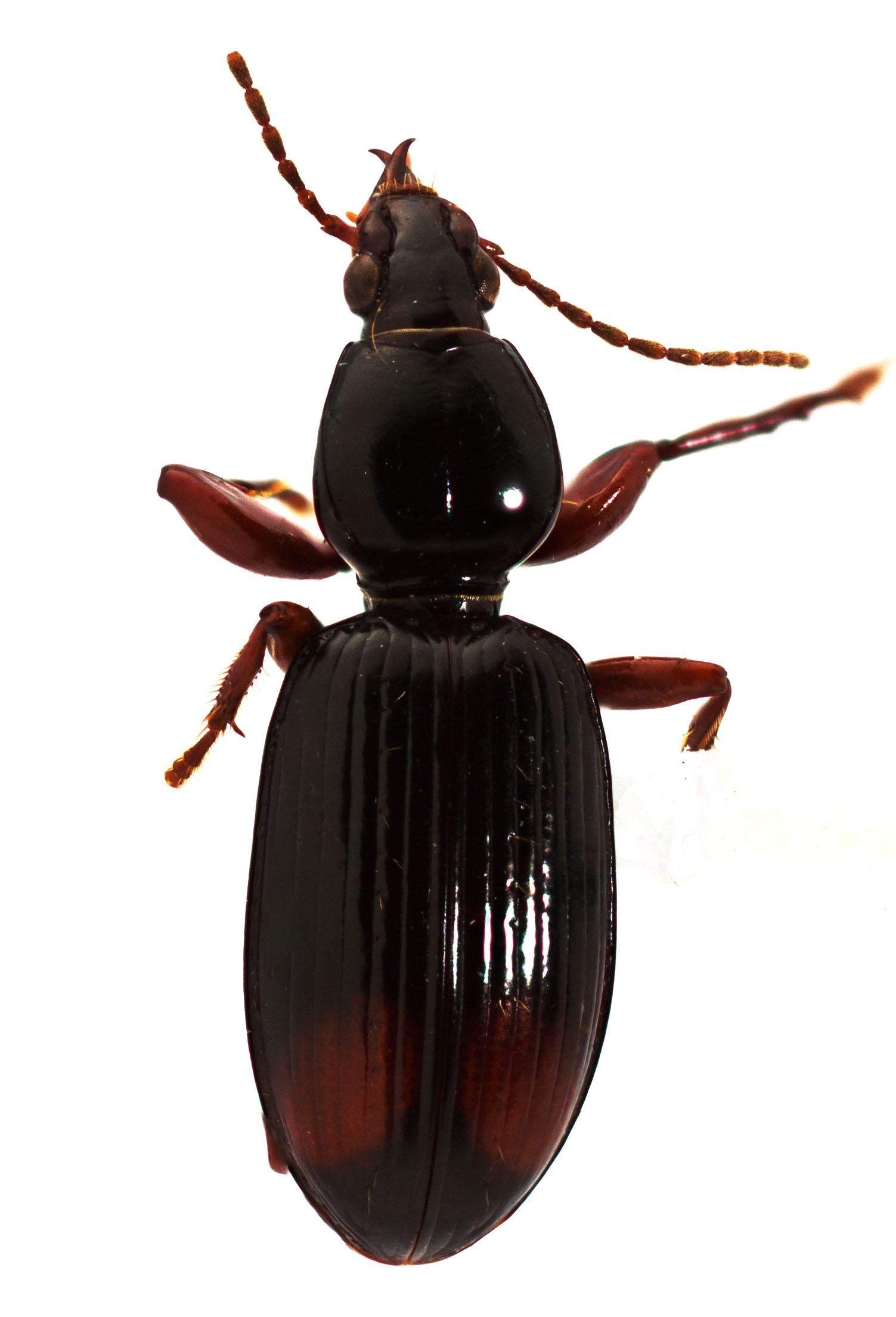

Scientific classification
- Domain: Eukaryota
- Kingdom: Animalia
- Phylum: Arthropoda
- Class: Insecta
- Order: Coleoptera
- Suborder: Adephaga
- Family: Carabidae
- Genus: Ardistomis
- Species: A. obliquata

Binomial name
- Ardistomis obliquata Putzeys, 1846

= Ardistomis obliquata =

Species of beetle

Ardistomis obliquata is a species of ground beetle in the family Carabidae. It is found in North America.
